= Drexler–Smalley debate on molecular nanotechnology =

The debate between K. Eric Drexler and Richard Smalley on the feasibility of molecular assemblers began in 2001 and concluded in a cover story in Chemical & Engineering News in 2003.

The Drexler–Smalley debate on molecular nanotechnology was a public dispute between K. Eric Drexler, the originator of the conceptual basis of molecular nanotechnology, and Richard Smalley, a recipient of the 1996 Nobel prize in Chemistry for the discovery of the nanomaterial buckminsterfullerene. The dispute was about the feasibility of constructing molecular assemblers, which are molecular machines that could robotically assemble molecular materials and devices by manipulating individual atoms or molecules. The concept of molecular assemblers was central to Drexler's conception of molecular nanotechnology, but Smalley argued that fundamental physical principles would prevent them from ever being possible. The two also traded accusations that the other's conception of nanotechnology was harmful to public perception of the field and threatened continued public support for nanotechnology research.

The debate was carried out from 2001 to 2003 through a series of published articles and open letters. It began with a 2001 article by Smalley in Scientific American, which was followed by a rebuttal published by Drexler and coworkers later that year, and two open letters by Drexler in early 2003. The debate was concluded in late 2003 in a "Point–Counterpoint" feature in Chemical & Engineering News in which both parties participated.

The debate has often been cited in the history of nanotechnology due to the fame of its participants and its commentary on both the technical and social aspects of nanotechnology. It has also been widely criticized for its adversarial tone, with Drexler accusing Smalley of publicly misrepresenting his work, and Smalley accusing Drexler of failing to understand basic science, causing commentators to go so far as to characterize the tone of the debate as similar to "a pissing match" and "reminiscent of [a] Saturday Night Live sketch".

== The participants ==
=== K. Eric Drexler ===
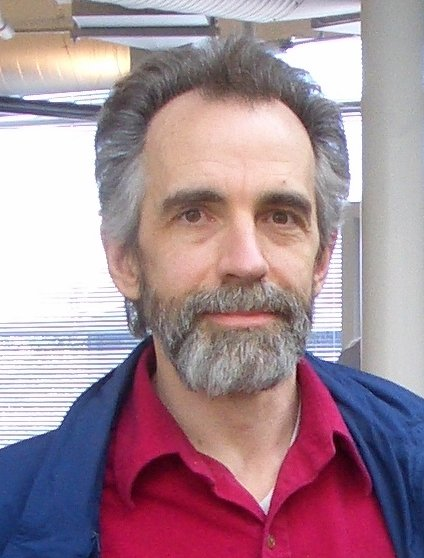
K. Eric Drexler developed and popularized the concept of nanotechnology and founded the field of molecular nanotechnology.

K. Eric Drexler is generally considered to have written the first scholarly paper on the topic of nanotechnology, and was a key figure in popularizing these concepts through several publications and advocacy work. Trained as an engineer, Drexler was inspired by a then-obscure 1959 talk by physicist Richard Feynman called There's Plenty of Room at the Bottom, which posited that it should be physically possible to manipulate individual atoms using top-down engineering methodologies. Drexler was also inspired by recent advances in molecular biology, such as recombinant DNA technology. In a 1981 publication in Proceedings of the National Academy of Sciences, considered to be the first journal article on nanotechnology, he argued that biological systems such as the ribosome were already capable of building molecules atom-by-atom, and that artificial machines with this capability could also be constructed. Drexler went on to publish two books on nanotechnology: Engines of Creation in 1986, which was intended for the public, and the technical work Nanosystems in 1992. He also co-founded the Foresight Institute, a public interest group devoted to increasing public awareness and information about molecular nanotechnology.

Drexler's vision of nanotechnology, now called molecular nanotechnology, is based on the concept of the molecular assembler, a molecular machine that would manufacture molecules and molecular devices atom-by-atom. Drexler drew a distinction between wet nanotechnology based on biological systems, and "second-generation" dry nanotechnology, which would be based on mechanosynthesis, positional control of molecules through principles more related to mechanical engineering. Drexler and his followers have focused almost exclusively on the latter form of molecular nanotechnology, but Drexler has stated that both are valid pathways to creating molecular machine systems.

=== Richard Smalley ===
Richard E. Smalley, a chemist at Rice University, was best known as a co-discoverer of the C_{60} form of carbon known as buckminsterfullerene in 1985, along with Harry Kroto, Robert Curl, James Heath, and Sean O'Brien. Buckminsterfullerene was the first to be discovered of the class of molecules known as fullerenes, which also includes carbon nanotubes. The study and application of fullerenes forms a significant part of the fields of nanomaterials and nanoelectronics, and Smalley, Kroto, and Curl were awarded the 1996 Nobel Prize in Chemistry for their discovery.

Smalley had also taken a prominent public policy role on nanotechnology and was an outspoken advocate for using nanotechnology to develop solutions to the world's energy and health problems, for example, raising the possibility of using nanomaterials for efficient energy storage and transmission, and of developing nanomaterial-based drugs for targeted drug delivery. Smalley was also active in commercializing his academic research into carbon nanotubes, having founded Carbon Nanotechnologies Inc., and serving on the scientific advisory board of two other biotechnology and nanotechnology startups. Smalley died of leukemia in October 2005, after the conclusion of his debate with Drexler.

== The debate ==
=== Smalley's Scientific American article ===
Smalley's 2001 Scientific American article doubting the feasibility of molecular assemblers led to a rebuttal by Drexler and his colleagues.

Smalley wrote an article, "Of Chemistry, Love, and Nanobots", for the September 2001 issue of the popular science magazine Scientific American, which was a special issue on the topic of nanotechnology. Smalley opened by comparing a chemical reaction to an intricate dance of atoms:

When a boy and a girl fall in love, it is often said that the chemistry between them is good. This common use of the word "chemistry" in human relations comes close to the subtlety of what actually happens in the more mundane coupling of molecules. In a chemical reaction between two 'consenting' molecules, bonds form between some of the atoms in what is usually a complex dance involving motion in multiple dimensions.... And if the chemistry is really, really good, the molecules that do react will all produce the exact product required.

He referenced the idea of a molecular assembler, a nanorobot capable of manipulating individual atoms to build a desired product, posing the question of how long it would take such an assembler to produce a meaningful amount of material. He estimated that one assembler working alone would take millions of years to produce one mole of material, but self-replicating assemblers could, within a minute, produce a large enough ensemble of assemblers that would then be capable of producing a mole of product in a fraction of a millisecond. Smalley then discussed the fear that the nanorobots could mutate and reproduce indefinitely, causing a grey goo scenario, or, referring to Bill Joy's previous article "Why the future doesn't need us", that the nanorobots could develop swarm intelligence and become alive in some sense.

Smalley then considered how realistic the concept of a self-replicating nanorobot was. He noted that in a chemical reaction, the chemical bonds are all interconnected and that the placement of each atom is sensitive to the position of all the other atoms in the vicinity. He then asserted that a molecular assembler would thus have to control many atoms simultaneously to work, and possess many manipulator arms. This led him to raise two objections to the concept of molecular assembler, which he called the "fat fingers problem" and the "sticky fingers problem":

Because the fingers of a manipulator arm must themselves be made out of atoms, they have a certain irreducible size. There just isn't enough room in the nanometer-size reaction region to accommodate all the fingers of all the manipulators necessary to have complete control of the chemistry.... [Also,] the atoms of the manipulator hands will adhere to the atom that is being moved. So it will often be impossible to release this minuscule building block in precisely the right spot. Both these problems are fundamental, and neither can be avoided. Self-replicating, mechanical nanobots are simply not possible in our world.

Smalley closed the article by returning to the analogy of chemistry as a dance of love, remarking that "you don't make a girl and a boy fall in love by pushing them together."

=== Drexler's response ===
Top, a schematic of the ribosome, which Drexler advanced as an example of a biological molecular machine due to its ability to precisely construct protein macromolecules from smaller amino acids. An animated version is also available. Bottom, a schematic of a scanning tunneling microscope, which Drexler cited as being able to manipulate individual molecules via positional control.

Drexler responded by publishing a rebuttal later in 2001 through the Institute for Molecular Manufacturing, which was co-authored with others including Robert Freitas, J. Storrs Hall, and Ralph Merkle. The authors first discussed the "fat fingers" argument by attacking Smalley's notion that a chemical reaction must involve five to fifteen atoms, stating that many reactions involve only two reactants, one of which can be immobilized and the other attached to a single "finger". They cited as evidence experimental and theoretical results indicating that using scanning tunneling microscope (STM) tips and related technologies could be used as a reactive structure for positional control and for interaction with surface-bound molecules. They also noted that atomically precise final products do not require precise control of all aspects of the chemical reaction. The authors noted that the "sticky fingers" problem is valid in some reactions, but argue that it would be fallacious to conclude that all reactions have this problem.

The authors put forth the ribosome as an example of a natural molecular machine; because the ribosome suffers from neither problem, they must not be fundamental, saying:

This ubiquitous biological molecular assembler suffers from neither the "fat finger" nor the "sticky finger" problem. If, as Smalley argues, both problems are "fundamental", then why would they prevent the development of mechanical assemblers and not biological assemblers? If the class of molecular structures known as proteins can be synthesized using positional techniques, then why would we expect there to be no other classes of molecular structures that can be synthesized using positional techniques?

The authors also questioned Smalley's figures for the replication time of nanomachines. Instead of Smalley's figure of 1 GHz for the atomic placement frequency, they point out that Nanosystems suggested a frequency of 1 MHz, a thousand times slower, and that at Smalley's higher frequency, diamondoid nanomachines would overheat and decompose in milliseconds. The authors called this a straw man argument, writing that "in a serious scientific discussion, a discrepancy of three orders of magnitude between what has been proposed in the literature and what is criticized suggests at best an inadequate grasp of the proposal." The authors closed by stating that the best way to find out whether molecular assemblers are feasible is through experimental and theoretical work, and that "there are many worthy molecular systems engineering challenges to overcome, but thus far, there has been no credible argument that these devices are infeasible."

Drexler followed up with two open letters to Smalley in April and July 2003. The April letter began, "I have written this open letter to correct your public misrepresentation of my work." Drexler accused Smalley of continuing to dismiss his work by publicly describing molecular assemblers as requiring what Drexler now calls "Smalley fingers", which he stated to be unlike the enzyme-like systems he had actually proposed. He asserted:

The impossibility of "Smalley fingers" has raised no concern in the research community because these fingers solve no problems and thus appear in no proposals. Your reliance on this straw-man attack might lead a thoughtful observer to suspect that no one has identified a valid criticism of my work. For this I should, perhaps, thank you.

Drexler compared the nanotechnology debate's importance to that of discussions of spaceflight before Sputnik or to theoretical work on nuclear chemistry before the Manhattan Project. He disputed Smalley's arguments that the fear of a grey goo scenario would hinder continued funding of nanotechnology research, arguing that the potential for long-term risks made research even more important. His conclusion stated, "Your misdirected arguments have needlessly confused public discussion of genuine long-term security concerns."

The July 2003 letter referenced a note from Smalley promising to respond, which had yet gone unfulfilled. Drexler mentions inconsistencies in Smalley's previous public statements on atom-by-atom construction, and ended by stating "I would not ordinarily raise an issue so persistently, but the question of what nanotechnology can ultimately achieve is perhaps the most fundamental issue in the field today—it shapes basic objectives and expectations—and your words have been remarkably effective in changing how this issue is perceived."

=== Exchange of letters in Chemical & Engineering News ===
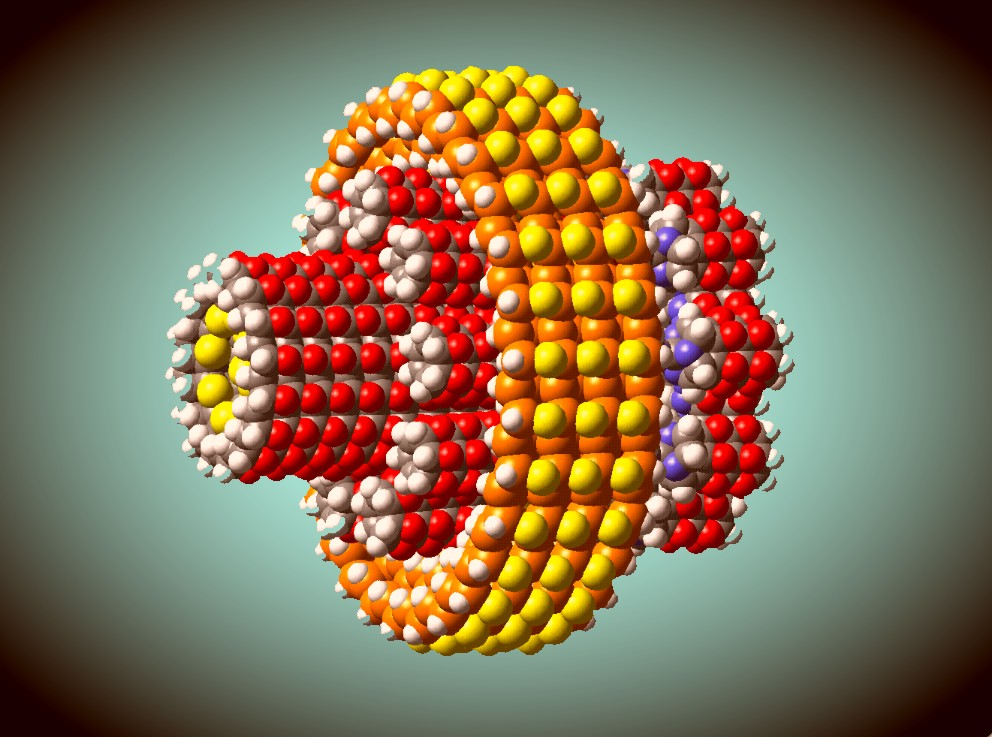
A depiction of a putative technomimetic molecular planetary gear set. Smalley questioned whether devices like these could be constructed using an enzyme-like mechanical process, either in an aqueous solution or with some other chemistry, and whether such devices would be operational at all.

The debate was concluded in a "Point–Counterpoint" feature that was the 1 December 2003 cover story of Chemical & Engineering News, the newsmagazine of the American Chemical Society. The feature first reproduced Drexler's April 2003 open letter to Smalley. Smalley's response began by apologizing for any offense his September 2001 article had caused, and stating that Drexler's book, Engines of Creation, had triggered Smalley's own interest in nanotechnology. He agreed that "Smalley fingers" could not work, and then asserted that the same reasons that would preclude atomic control of reactions would also preclude the manipulation of larger building blocks, since each molecule would have multiple atoms that would need to be controlled.

He then agreed that something like an enzyme or ribosome would be capable of precise chemistry, but asked how the nanorobot would be able to obtain, control, and repair such an enzyme, and noted the incompatibility of many reactions with water-based biological systems, stating that "biology is wonderous in the vast diversity of what it can build, but it can't make a crystal of silicon, or steel, or copper, or aluminum, or titanium, or virtually any of the key materials on which modern technology is built." Smalley asked what kind of "nonaqueous enzymelike chemistry" Drexler would envision for his molecular assemblers to operate upon, calling this "a vast area of chemistry that has eluded us for centuries."

Drexler's counterresponse began by returning to Feynman's 1959 talk, stating that "although inspired by biology... Feynman's vision of nanotechnology is fundamentally mechanical, not biological." He characterized the challenges as being those of systems engineering rather than solely chemistry, and referred Smalley to Nanosystems, with its vision of mechanical control of chemical reactions with no enzymes and no reliance on solvents or thermal motion. He stated:

Positional control naturally avoids most side reactions by preventing unwanted encounters between potential reactants. Transition-state theory indicates that, for suitably chosen reactants, positional control will enable synthetic steps at megahertz frequencies with the reliability of digital switching operations in a computer. The supporting analysis for this conclusion appears in "Nanosystems" and has withstood a decade of scientific scrutiny.

Drexler reiterated that these molecular assemblers would require no impossible fingers, and would augment solution-phase chemistry to produce macroscopic products with precise arrangements of chemical building blocks, using solution-phase molecular assemblers to bootstrap the construction of more sophisticated assemblers. He concluded by writing:

U.S. progress in molecular manufacturing has been impeded by the dangerous illusion that it is infeasible. I hope you will agree that the actual physical principles of molecular manufacturing are sound and quite unlike the various notions, many widespread in the press, that you have correctly rejected. I invite you to join me and others in the call to augment today's nanoscale research with a systems engineering effort aimed at achieving the grand vision articulated by Richard Feynman.

Smalley began his concluding letter:

I see you have now walked out of the room where I had led you to talk about real chemistry, and you are now back in your mechanical world. I am sorry we have ended up like this. For a moment I thought we were making progress. You still do not appear to understand the impact of my short piece in Scientific American. Much like you can't make a boy and a girl fall in love with each other simply by pushing them together, you cannot make precise chemistry occur as desired between two molecular objects with simple mechanical motion along a few degrees of freedom in the assembler-fixed frame of reference. Chemistry, like love, is more subtle than that.

Smalley stated his belief that most reactions using mechanosynthesis would simply give the wrong product, and that very few reactions and target molecules would likely be compatible with such an approach. He asserted that any robotic assembler arm would need an enzyme-like tool at its end, such would require a liquid medium. As all known enzymes use water as their medium, the range of products must be limited to the "meat and bone of biology." He accused Drexler of creating "a pretend world where atoms go where you want because your computer program directs them to go there."

Lastly, Smalley recounted his recent experience reading essays written by middle and high school students after an outreach visit, saying that nearly half of them thought that self-replicating nanorobots were possible and that most were worried about the results of them spreading across the world. Smalley called this a deeply troubling bedside story that he did his best to allay. Smalley concluded his letter:

You and people around you have scared our children. I don't expect you to stop, but I hope others in the chemical community will join with me in turning on the light, and showing our children that, while our future in the real world will be challenging and there are real risks, there will be no such monster as the self-replicating mechanical nanobot of your dreams.

== Critical response ==
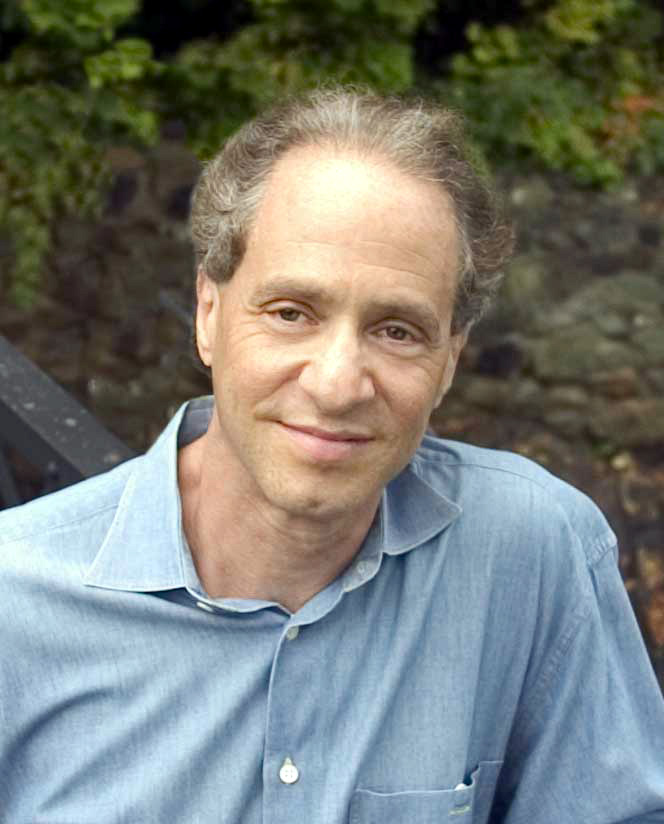
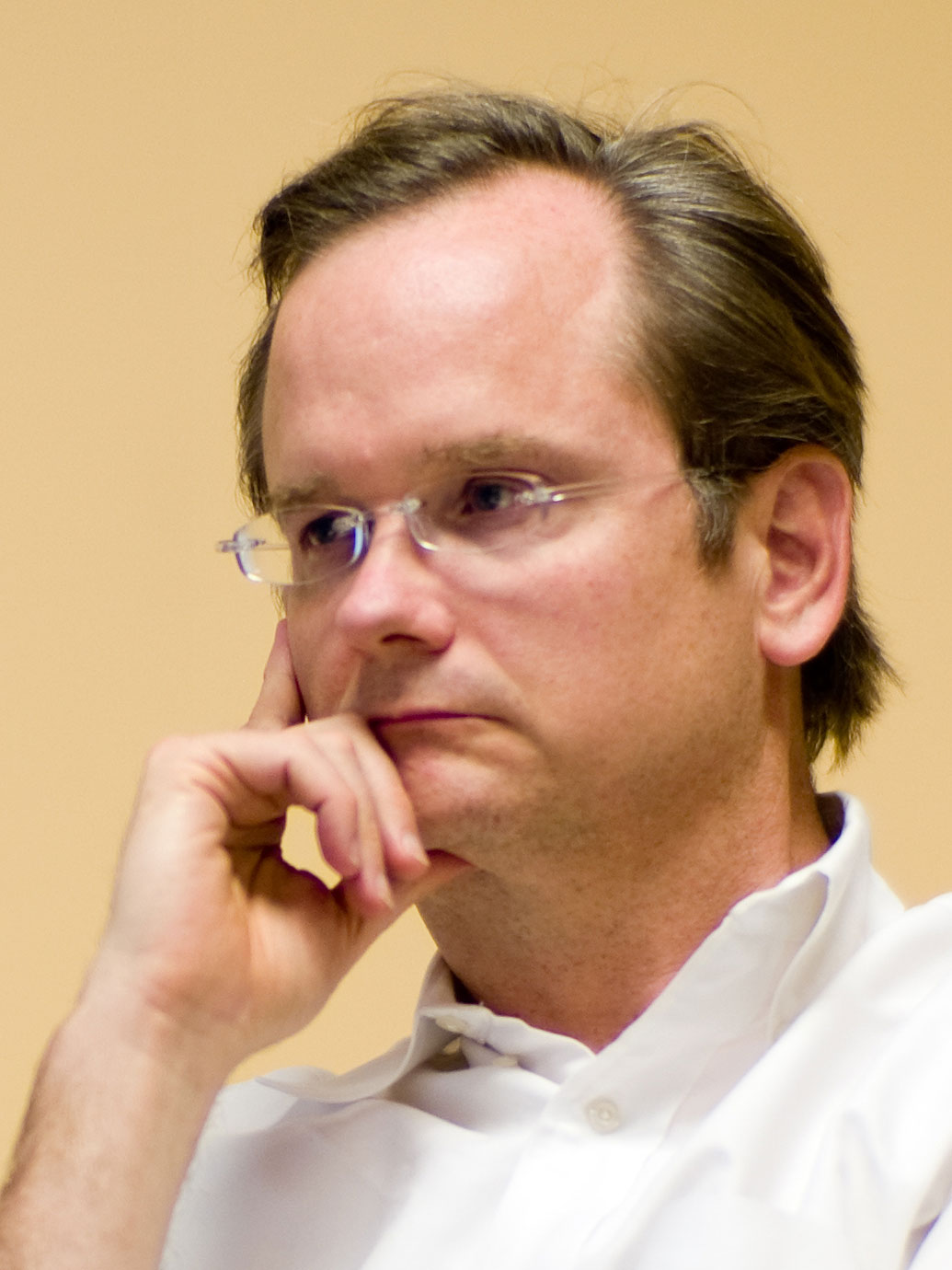
The Drexler–Smalley debate attracted commentary from figures such as Ray Kurzweil (left) and Lawrence Lessig (right).

=== Tone ===
The debate has been widely criticized for its adversarial tone. David Berube in Nano-Hype: The Truth Behind the Nanotechnology Buzz characterized it as "two people talking over each other... not conducive to reasonable rebuttal," and quoted nanotechnology blogger and journalist Howard Lovy as saying "the tenor of the debate is about personal pride, reputation, and a place in the pantheon." Zyvex founder James von Ehr remarked that "Eric [Drexler] didn't do himself any favors by getting into a pissing match with a Nobel-prize winner." An article in The New York Times called the debate "reminiscent of that old Saturday Night Live sketch... [with] Dan Aykroyd and Jane Curtin tossing insults at each other while ostensibly debating a serious political issue," referring to a version of the show's long-running Weekend Update segment.

=== Technical commentary ===
The debate has received technical criticism as well. Steven A. Edwards in The Nanotech Pioneers noted that the ambiguity of the specifications and even definition of a molecular assembler makes an evaluation of the argument difficult and minimizes its scientific implications. He remarked that "nowhere in it does Nanosystems contain a blueprint for a molecular assembler... We are told, for instance, that a manipulator arm would involve 4,000,000 atoms, but we are not told which atoms, or how they would be put together." He concludes that "the debate over mechanosynthesis so far is huge to the participants, but mainly an entertaining academic diversion to most nanotechnologists."

On the other hand, futurist Ray Kurzweil declared Drexler as the winner of the debate in his book The Singularity Is Near, reiterating the view that Smalley distorted Drexler's ideas and calling Smalley's responses "short on specific citations and current research and long on imprecise metaphors" and asserting that "Smalley is ignoring the past decade of research on alternative means of positioning molecular fragments using precisely guided molecular reactions... [which have] been extensively studied." He quoted experimental results on enzyme function in nonaqueous solutions, and pointed out that modern non-biological technology such as airplanes and computers have exceeded the capabilities of natural biological systems. He also noted that "earlier critics also expressed skepticism that either worldwide communication networks or software viruses that would spread across them were feasible... [but today] we are obtaining far more gain than harm from this latest example of intertwined promise and peril."

=== Commentary on public perception of nanotechnology ===
The debate's focus on the public perception of nanotechnology has also received commentary. Political blogger Glenn Reynolds stated that "the business community is afraid that advanced nanotechnology just seems too, well, spooky—and worse, that discussions of potentially spooky implications will lead to public fears that might get into the way of bringing products to market." Lawrence Lessig criticized the scientific establishment, represented by Smalley, for arguing that "if so-called dangerous nanotech can be relegated to summer sci-fi movies and forgotten after Labor Day, then serious work can continue, supported by billion-dollar funding and uninhibited by the idiocy that buries, for example, stem cell research." Kurzweil wrote that Smalley's approach to reassuring the public would backfire because it denied both the benefits and risks of molecular nanotechnology.
