= Mechanosynthesis =

Term for chemical syntheses

Mechanosynthesis is a term for chemical syntheses in which reaction outcomes are determined by the use of mechanical constraints to direct reactive molecules to specific molecular sites. The first examples of both additive and subtractive mechanosynthesis have been demonstrated using a technique referred to as inverted-mode scanning tunneling microscopy (IM-STM). Prior to this work, there had been no non-biological chemical syntheses that achieved this aim, with only some atomic placement achieved with conventional scanning tunnelling microscopes.

== Introduction ==
A ribosome is a biological machine.

In conventional chemical synthesis or chemosynthesis, reactive molecules encounter one another through random thermal motion in a liquid or vapor. In a hypothesized process of mechanosynthesis, reactive molecules would be attached to molecular mechanical systems, and their encounters would result from mechanical motions bringing them together in planned sequences, positions, and orientations. It is envisioned that mechanosynthesis would avoid unwanted reactions by keeping potential reactants apart, and would strongly favor desired reactions by holding reactants together in optimal orientations for many molecular vibration cycles. In biology, the ribosome provides an example of a programmable mechanosynthetic device.

A non-biological form of mechanochemistry has been performed at cryogenic temperatures using scanning tunneling microscopes. So far, such devices provide the closest approach to fabrication tools for molecular engineering. Broader exploitation of mechanosynthesis awaits more advanced technology for constructing molecular machine systems, with ribosome-like systems as an attractive early objective.

Much of the excitement regarding advanced mechanosynthesis regards its potential use in assembly of molecular-scale devices. Such techniques appear to have many applications in medicine, aviation, resource extraction, manufacturing and warfare.

Most theoretical explorations of advanced machines of this kind have focused on using carbon, because of the many strong bonds it can form, the many types of chemistry these bonds permit, and utility of these bonds in medical and mechanical applications. Carbon forms diamond, for example, which if cheaply available, would be an excellent material for many machines.

It has been suggested, notably by K. Eric Drexler, that mechanosynthesis will be fundamental to molecular manufacturing based on nanofactories capable of building macroscopic objects with atomic precision. The potential for these has been disputed, notably by Nobel Laureate Richard Smalley (who proposed and then critiqued an unworkable approach based on "Smalley fingers").

The Nanofactory Collaboration, founded by Robert Freitas and Ralph Merkle in 2000, is a focused ongoing effort involving 23 researchers from 10 organizations and 4 countries that is developing a practical research agenda specifically aimed at positionally controlled diamond mechanosynthesis and diamondoid nanofactory development.

In practice, getting exactly one molecule to a known place on the microscope's tip is possible, but has proven difficult to automate. Since practical products require at least several hundred million atoms, this technique has not yet proven practical in forming a real product.

The goal of one line of mechanoassembly research focuses on overcoming these problems by calibration, and selection of appropriate synthesis reactions. Some suggest attempting to develop a specialized, very small (roughly 1,000 nanometers on a side) machine tool that can build copies of itself using mechanochemical means, under the control of an external computer. In the literature, such a tool is called an assembler or molecular assembler. Once assemblers exist, geometric growth (directing copies to make copies) could reduce the cost of assemblers rapidly. Control by an external computer should then permit large groups of assemblers to construct large, useful projects to atomic precision. One such project would combine molecular-level conveyor belts with permanently mounted assemblers to produce a factory.

In part to resolve this and related questions about the dangers of industrial accidents and popular fears of runaway events equivalent to Chernobyl and Bhopal disasters, and the more remote issue of ecophagy, grey goo and green goo (various potential disasters arising from runaway replicators, which could be built using mechanosynthesis) the UK Royal Society and UK Royal Academy of Engineering in 2003 commissioned a study to deal with these issues and larger social and ecological implications, led by mechanical engineering professor Ann Dowling. This was anticipated by some to take a strong position on these problems and potentials —– and suggest any development path to a general theory of so-called mechanosynthesis. However, the Royal Society's nanotech report did not address molecular manufacturing at all, except to dismiss it along with grey goo.

Current technical proposals for nanofactories do not include self-replicating nanorobots, and recent ethical guidelines would prohibit development of unconstrained self-replication capabilities in nanomachines.

== Diamond mechanosynthesis ==
There is a growing body of peer-reviewed theoretical work on synthesizing diamond by mechanically removing/adding hydrogen atoms and depositing carbon atoms (a process known as diamond mechanosynthesis or DMS). For example, the 2006 paper in this continuing research effort by Freitas, Merkle and their collaborators reports that the most-studied mechanosynthesis tooltip motif (DCB6Ge) successfully places a C_{2} carbon dimer on a C(110) diamond surface at both 300 K (room temperature) and 80 K (liquid nitrogen temperature), and that the silicon variant (DCB6Si) also works at 80 K but not at 300 K. These tooltips are intended to be used only in carefully controlled environments (e.g., vacuum). Maximum acceptable limits for tooltip translational and rotational misplacement errors are reported in paper III—tooltips must be positioned with great accuracy to avoid bonding the dimer incorrectly. Over 100,000 CPU hours were invested in this study.

The DCB6Ge tooltip motif, initially described at a Foresight Conference in 2002, was the first complete tooltip ever proposed for diamond mechanosynthesis and remains the only tooltip motif that has been successfully simulated for its intended function on a full 200-atom diamond surface. Although an early paper gives a predicted placement speed of 1 dimer per second for this tooltip, this limit was imposed by the slow speed of recharging the tool using an inefficient recharging method and is not based on any inherent limitation in the speed of use of a charged tooltip. Additionally, no sensing means was proposed for discriminating among the three possible outcomes of an attempted dimer placement—deposition at the correct location, deposition at the wrong location, and failure to place the dimer at all—because the initial proposal was to position the tooltip by dead reckoning, with the proper reaction assured by designing appropriate chemical energetics and relative bond strengths for the tooltip-surface interaction.

More recent theoretical work analyzes a complete set of nine molecular tools made from hydrogen, carbon and germanium able to (a) synthesize all tools in the set (b) recharge all tools in the set from appropriate feedstock molecules and (c) synthesize a wide range of stiff hydrocarbons (diamond, graphite, fullerenes, and the like). All required reactions are analyzed using standard ab initio quantum chemistry methods.

Further research to consider alternate tips will require time-consuming computational chemistry and difficult laboratory work. In the early 2000s, a typical experimental arrangement was to attach a molecule to the tip of an atomic force microscope, and then use the microscope's precise positioning abilities to push the molecule on the tip into another on a substrate. Since the angles and distances can be precisely controlled, and the reaction occurs in a vacuum, novel chemical compounds and arrangements are possible.

== History ==
The technique of moving single atoms mechanically was proposed by Eric Drexler in his 1986 book The Engines of Creation.

In 1989, researchers at IBM's Zürich Research Institute successfully spelled the letters "IBM" in xenon atoms on a cryogenic copper surface, grossly validating the approach. Since then, a number of research projects have undertaken to use similar techniques to store computer data in a compact fashion. More recently the technique has been used to explore novel physical chemistries, sometimes using lasers to excite the tips to particular energy states, or examine the quantum chemistry of particular chemical bonds.

In 1999, an experimentally proved methodology called feature-oriented scanning (FOS) was suggested. The feature-oriented scanning methodology allows precisely controlling the position of the probe of a scanning probe microscope (SPM) on an atomic surface at room temperature. The suggested methodology supports fully automatic control of single- and multiprobe instruments in solving tasks of mechanosynthesis and bottom-up nanofabrication.

In 2003, Oyabu et al. reported the first instance of purely mechanical-based covalent bond-making and bond-breaking, i.e., the first experimental demonstration of true mechanosynthesis—albeit with silicon rather than carbon atoms.

In 2005, the first patent application on diamond mechanosynthesis was filed.

In 2008, a $3.1 million grant was proposed to fund the development of a proof-of-principle mechanosynthesis system.

In 2013, IBM made A Boy and His Atom, a short animated film using atoms.

In 2025, researchers at CBN Nano Technologies, Inc. introduced inverted-mode scanning tunneling microscopy (IM-STM), a technique in which tailored alkynyl-terminated molecules deposited on a Si(100) surface serve a dual role: imaging the atomic configuration of the STM probe apex and acting as chemical reagents in mechanically controlled reactions across the tunnel junction. By positioning both sides of the junction with sub-ångström precision, the method enables reproducible abstraction of hydrogen atoms from the probe, demonstrating positionally-controlled, atomically precise, zero-bias subtractive mechanosynthesis. The authors propose that the approach generalizes to other elements and chemical moieties, offering a route toward scalable atomically precise fabrication.

In 2026, researchers at CBN Nano Technologies, Inc. then reported the first demonstration of atomically precise additive mechanosynthesis in the form of the donation of carbon structures onto a hydrogenated Si(100) surface using IM-STM at 4 K. Upon mechanical approach to pre-patterned dangling-bond (DB) sites, deposited tools transferred C₂ units via Ge–C bond cleavage along a net-downhill energy pathway, yielding inter-row C₂ adducts (IR-C₂) at a 93% success rate (184 of 197 interactions). Iterative application of the process extended surface-bound C₂ structures through successive C–C bond formation, producing four-carbon chains (IR-C₄) and spatially-patterned multi-site carbon arrays, establishing positionally controlled mechanosynthetic donation as a reproducible capability for potential programmable atomically precise fabrication.

See also molecular nanotechnology, a more general explanation of the possible products, and discussion of other assembly techniques.
