= Molecular nanotechnology =

Technology

Kinesin is a protein complex functioning as a biological machine. Protein domain dynamics can only be seen by neutron spin echo spectroscopy.

Molecular nanotechnology (MNT) is a technology based on the ability to build structures to complex, atomic specifications by means of mechanosynthesis. This is distinct from nanoscale materials.

Based on Richard Feynman's vision of miniature factories using nanomachines to build complex products (including additional nanomachines), this advanced form of nanotechnology (or molecular manufacturing) would make use of positionally-controlled mechanosynthesis guided by molecular machine systems.

MNT would involve combining physical principles demonstrated by biophysics, chemistry, other nanotechnologies, and the molecular machinery of life, with the systems engineering principles found in modern macroscale factories.

== Introduction ==
While conventional chemistry uses inexact processes obtaining inexact results, and biology exploits inexact processes to obtain definitive results, molecular nanotechnology would employ original definitive processes to obtain definitive results. The desire in molecular nanotechnology would be to balance molecular reactions in positionally-controlled locations and orientations to obtain desired chemical reactions and then to build systems by further assembling the products of these reactions.

A roadmap for the development of MNT is an objective of a broadly based technology project led by Battelle (the manager of several U.S. National Laboratories) and the Foresight Institute. The roadmap was originally scheduled for completion by late 2006 but was released in January 2008. The Nanofactory Collaboration is a more focused ongoing effort involving 23 researchers from 10 organizations and 4 countries that is developing a practical research agenda specifically aimed at positionally-controlled diamond mechanosynthesis and diamondoid nanofactory development. In August 2005, a task force consisting of 50+ international experts from various fields was organized by the Center for Responsible Nanotechnology to study the societal implications of molecular nanotechnology.

== Projected applications and capabilities ==
=== Smart materials and nanosensors ===
Any sort of material designed and engineered at the nanometer scale for a specific task is a smart material. If materials could be designed to respond differently to various molecules, for example, artificial drugs could recognize and render inert specific viruses. Self-healing structures would repair small tears in a surface naturally in the same way as human skin.

A nanosensor would resemble a smart material, involving a small component within a larger machine that would react to its environment and change in some fundamental, intentional way. A very simple example: a photosensor might passively measure the incident light and discharge its absorbed energy as electricity when the light passes above or below a specified threshold, sending a signal to a larger machine. Such a sensor would supposedly cost less and use less power than a conventional sensor, and yet function usefully in all the same applications — for example, turning on parking lot lights when it gets dark.

While smart materials and nanosensors both exemplify useful applications of MNT, they pale in comparison with the complexity of the technology most popularly associated with the term: the replicating nanorobot.

=== Replicating nanorobots ===
MNT nanofacturing is popularly linked with the idea of swarms of coordinated nanoscale robots working together, a popularization of an early proposal by K. Eric Drexler in his 1986 discussions of MNT, but superseded in 1992. In this early proposal, sufficiently capable nanorobots would construct more nanorobots in an artificial environment containing special molecular building blocks.

Critics have doubted both the feasibility of self-replicating nanorobots and the feasibility of control if self-replicating nanorobots could be achieved: they cite the possibility of mutations removing any control and favoring reproduction of mutant pathogenic variations. Advocates address the first doubt by pointing out that the first macroscale autonomous machine replicator, made of Lego blocks, was built and operated experimentally in 2002. While there are sensory advantages present at the macroscale compared to the limited sensorium available at the nanoscale, proposals for positionally controlled nanoscale mechanosynthetic fabrication systems employ dead reckoning of tooltips combined with reliable reaction sequence design to ensure reliable results, hence a limited sensorium is no handicap; similar considerations apply to the positional assembly of small nanoparts. Advocates address the second doubt by arguing that bacteria are (of necessity) evolved to evolve, while nanorobot mutation could be actively prevented by common error-correcting techniques. Similar ideas are advocated in the Foresight Guidelines on Molecular Nanotechnology, and a map of the 137-dimensional replicator design space recently published by Freitas and Merkle provides numerous proposed methods by which replicators could, in principle, be safely controlled by good design.

However, the concept of suppressing mutation raises the question: How can design evolution occur at the nanoscale without a process of random mutation and deterministic selection? Critics argue that MNT advocates have not provided a substitute for such a process of evolution in this nanoscale arena where conventional sensory-based selection processes are lacking. The limits of the sensorium available at the nanoscale could make it difficult or impossible to winnow successes from failures. Advocates argue that design evolution should occur deterministically and strictly under human control, using the conventional engineering paradigm of modeling, design, prototyping, testing, analysis, and redesign.

In any event, since 1992 technical proposals for MNT do not include self-replicating nanorobots, and recent ethical guidelines put forth by MNT advocates prohibit unconstrained self-replication.

=== Medical nanorobots ===
One of the most important applications of MNT would be medical nanorobotics or nanomedicine, an area pioneered by Robert Freitas in numerous books and papers. The ability to design, build, and deploy large numbers of medical nanorobots would, at a minimum, make possible the rapid elimination of disease and the reliable and relatively painless recovery from physical trauma. Medical nanorobots might also make possible the convenient correction of genetic defects, and help to ensure a greatly expanded lifespan. More controversially, medical nanorobots might be used to augment natural human capabilities. One study has reported on how conditions like tumors, arteriosclerosis, blood clots leading to stroke, accumulation of scar tissue and localized pockets of infection can possibly be addressed by employing medical nanorobots.

=== Utility fog ===
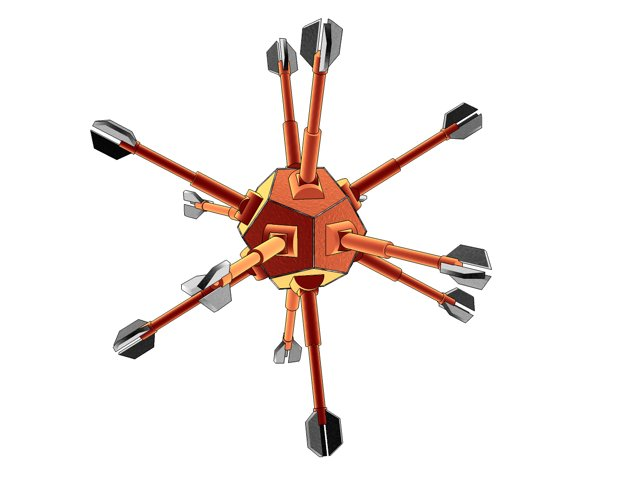
Diagram of a 100 micrometer foglet

Another proposed application of molecular nanotechnology is "utility fog" – in which a cloud of networked microscopic robots (simpler than molecular assemblers) would change its shape and properties to form macroscopic objects and tools in accordance with software commands. Rather than modify the current practices of consuming material goods in different forms, utility fog would simply replace many physical objects.

=== Phased-array optics ===
Yet another proposed application of MNT would be phased-array optics (PAO). However, this appears to be a problem addressable by ordinary nanoscale technology. PAO would use the principle of phased-array millimeter technology but at optical wavelengths. This would permit duplicating any sort of optical effect, but virtually. Users could request holograms, sunrises and sunsets, or floating lasers as desired. PAO systems were described in BC Crandall's Nanotechnology: Molecular Speculations on Global Abundance in the Brian Wowk article Phased-Array Optics.

== Potential social impacts ==
Molecular manufacturing is a potential future subfield of nanotechnology that would make it possible to build complex structures at atomic precision. Molecular manufacturing requires significant advances in nanotechnology, but once achieved could produce highly advanced products at low costs and in large quantities in nanofactories weighing a kilogram or more. When nanofactories gain the ability to produce other nanofactories production may only be limited by relatively abundant factors such as input materials, energy and software.

The products of molecular manufacturing could range from cheaper, mass-produced versions of known high-tech products to novel products with added abilities in many areas of application. Some applications that have been suggested are advanced smart materials, nanosensors, medical nanorobots, and space travel. Further, molecular manufacturing could be used to cheaply produce highly advanced, durable weapons, which is an area of special concern regarding the impact of nanotechnology. Being equipped with compact computers and motors these could be increasingly autonomous and have a large range of abilities.

According to Chris Phoenix and Mike Treder from the Center for Responsible Nanotechnology, and Anders Sandberg from the Future of Humanity Institute, molecular manufacturing is the application of nanotechnology that poses the most significant global catastrophic risk. Several nanotechnology researchers state that the bulk of risk from nanotechnology comes from the potential to lead to war, arms races and destructive global government. Several reasons have been suggested why the availability of nanotech weaponry may with significant likelihood lead to unstable arms races (compared to e.g. nuclear arms races): (1) A large number of players may be tempted to enter the race since the threshold for doing so is low; (2) the ability to make weapons with molecular manufacturing will be cheap and easy to hide; (3) therefore lack of insight into the other parties' abilities can tempt players to arm out of caution or to launch preemptive strikes; (4) molecular manufacturing may reduce dependency on international trade, a potential peace-promoting factor; (5) wars of aggression may pose a smaller economic threat to the aggressor since manufacturing is cheap and humans may not be needed on the battlefield.

Since self-regulation by all state and non-state actors seems hard to achieve, measures to mitigate war-related risks have mainly been proposed in the area of international cooperation. International infrastructure may be expanded giving more sovereignty to the international level. This could help coordinate efforts for arms control. International institutions dedicated specifically to nanotechnology (perhaps analogously to the International Atomic Energy Agency IAEA) or general arms control may also be designed. One may also jointly progress in differential technological development on defensive technologies, a policy that players should usually favour. The Center for Responsible Nanotechnology also suggest some technical restrictions. Improved transparency regarding technological abilities may be another important facilitator for arms-control.

A grey goo is another catastrophic scenario, which was proposed by Eric Drexler in his 1986 book Engines of Creation, has been analyzed by Freitas in "Some Limits to Global Ecophagy by Biovorous Nanoreplicators, with Public Policy Recommendations" and has been a theme in mainstream media and fiction. This scenario involves tiny self-replicating robots that consume the entire biosphere using it as a source of energy and building blocks. Nanotech experts including Drexler now discredit the scenario. According to Chris Phoenix a "So-called grey goo could only be the product of a deliberate and difficult engineering process, not an accident". With the advent of nano-biotech, a different scenario called green goo has been forwarded. Here, the malignant substance is not nanobots but rather self-replicating biological organisms engineered through nanotechnology.

=== Benefits ===
Nanotechnology (or molecular nanotechnology to refer more specifically to the goals discussed here) will let us continue the historical trends in manufacturing right up to the fundamental limits imposed by physical law. It will let us make remarkably powerful molecular computers. It will let us make materials over fifty times lighter than steel or aluminium alloy but with the same strength. We'll be able to make jets, rockets, cars or even chairs that, by today's standards, would be remarkably light, strong, and inexpensive. Molecular surgical tools, guided by molecular computers and injected into the blood stream could find and destroy cancer cells or invading bacteria, unclog arteries, or provide oxygen when the circulation is impaired.

Nanotechnology will replace our entire manufacturing base with a new, radically more precise, radically less expensive, and radically more flexible way of making products. The aim is not simply to replace today's computer chip making plants, but also to replace the assembly lines for cars, televisions, telephones, books, surgical tools, missiles, bookcases, airplanes, tractors, and all the rest. The objective is a pervasive change in manufacturing, a change that will leave virtually no product untouched. Economic progress and military readiness in the 21st Century will depend fundamentally on maintaining a competitive position in nanotechnology.

Despite the current early developmental status of nanotechnology and molecular nanotechnology, much concern surrounds MNT's anticipated impact on economics and on law. Whatever the exact effects, MNT, if achieved, would tend to reduce the scarcity of manufactured goods and make many more goods (such as food and health aids) manufacturable.

MNT should make possible nanomedical abilities to cure any medical condition not already cured by advances in other areas. Good health would be common, and poor health of any form would be as rare as smallpox and scurvy are today. Even cryonics would be feasible, as cryopreserved tissue could be fully repaired.

=== Risks ===
Molecular nanotechnology is one of the technologies that some analysts believe could lead to a technological singularity, in which technological growth has accelerated to the point of having unpredictable effects. Some effects could be beneficial, while others could be detrimental, such as the utilization of molecular nanotechnology by an unfriendly artificial general intelligence. Some feel that molecular nanotechnology would have daunting risks. It conceivably could enable cheaper and more destructive conventional weapons. Also, molecular nanotechnology might permit weapons of mass destruction that could self-replicate, as viruses and cancer cells do when attacking the human body. Commentators generally agree that, in the event molecular nanotechnology were developed, its self-replication should be permitted only under very controlled or "inherently safe" conditions.

A fear exists that nanomechanical robots, if achieved, and if designed to self-replicate using naturally occurring materials (a difficult task), could consume the entire planet in their hunger for raw materials, or simply crowd out natural life, out-competing it for energy (as happened historically when blue-green algae appeared and outcompeted earlier life forms). Some commentators have referred to this situation as the "grey goo" or "ecophagy" scenario. K. Eric Drexler considers an accidental "grey goo" scenario extremely unlikely and says so in later editions of Engines of Creation.

In light of this perception of potential danger, the Foresight Institute, founded by Drexler, has prepared a set of guidelines for the ethical development of nanotechnology. These include the banning of free-foraging self-replicating pseudo-organisms on the Earth's surface, at least, and possibly in other places.

== Technical issues and criticism ==
The feasibility of the basic technologies analyzed in Nanosystems has been the subject of a formal scientific review by U.S. National Academy of Sciences, and has also been the focus of extensive debate on the internet and in the popular press.

=== Study and recommendations by the U.S. National Academy of Sciences ===
In 2006, U.S. National Academy of Sciences released the report of a study of molecular manufacturing as part of a longer report, A Matter of Size: Triennial Review of the National Nanotechnology Initiative The study committee reviewed the technical content of Nanosystems, and in its conclusion states that no current theoretical analysis can be considered definitive regarding several questions of potential system performance, and that optimal paths for implementing high-performance systems cannot be predicted with confidence. It recommends experimental research to advance knowledge in this area:

"Although theoretical calculations can be made today, the eventually attainable range of chemical reaction cycles, error rates, speed of operation, and thermodynamic efficiencies of such bottom-up manufacturing systems cannot be reliably predicted at this time. Thus, the eventually attainable perfection and complexity of manufactured products, while they can be calculated in theory, cannot be predicted with confidence. Finally, the optimum research paths that might lead to systems which greatly exceed the thermodynamic efficiencies and other capabilities of biological systems cannot be reliably predicted at this time. Research funding that is based on the ability of investigators to produce experimental demonstrations that link to abstract models and guide long-term vision is most appropriate to achieve this goal."

=== Assemblers versus nanofactories ===
A section heading in Drexler's Engines of Creation reads "Universal Assemblers", and the following text speaks of multiple types of assemblers which, collectively, could hypothetically "build almost anything that the laws of nature allow to exist." Drexler's colleague Ralph Merkle has noted that, contrary to widespread legend, Drexler never claimed that assembler systems could build absolutely any molecular structure. The endnotes in Drexler's book explain the qualification "almost": "For example, a delicate structure might be designed that, like a stone arch, would self-destruct unless all its pieces were already in place. If there were no room in the design for the placement and removal of a scaffolding, then the structure might be impossible to build. Few structures of practical interest seem likely to exhibit such a problem, however."

In 1992, Drexler published Nanosystems: Molecular Machinery, Manufacturing, and Computation, a detailed proposal for synthesizing stiff covalent structures using a table-top factory. Diamondoid structures and other stiff covalent structures, if achieved, would have a wide range of possible applications, going far beyond current MEMS technology. An outline of a path was put forward in 1992 for building a table-top factory in the absence of an assembler. Other researchers have begun advancing tentative, alternative proposed paths for this in the years since Nanosystems was published.

=== Hard versus soft nanotechnology ===
In 2004 Richard Jones wrote Soft Machines (nanotechnology and life), a book for lay audiences published by Oxford University. In this book he describes radical nanotechnology (as advocated by Drexler) as a deterministic/mechanistic idea of nano engineered machines that does not take into account the nanoscale challenges such as wetness, stickiness, Brownian motion, and high viscosity. He also explains what is soft nanotechnology or more appropriately biomimetic nanotechnology which is the way forward, if not the best way, to design functional nanodevices that can cope with all the problems at a nanoscale. One can think of soft nanotechnology as the development of nanomachines that uses the lessons learned from biology on how things work, chemistry to precisely engineer such devices and stochastic physics to model the system and its natural processes in detail.

=== The Smalley–Drexler debate ===
Several researchers, including Nobel Prize winner Dr. Richard Smalley (1943–2005), attacked the notion of universal assemblers, leading to a rebuttal from Drexler and colleagues, and eventually to an exchange of letters. Smalley argued that chemistry is extremely complicated, reactions are hard to control, and that a universal assembler is science fiction. Drexler and colleagues, however, noted that Drexler never proposed universal assemblers able to make absolutely anything, but instead proposed more limited assemblers able to make a very wide variety of things. They challenged the relevance of Smalley's arguments to the more specific proposals advanced in Nanosystems. Also, Smalley argued that nearly all of modern chemistry involves reactions that take place in a solvent (usually water), because the small molecules of a solvent contribute many things, such as lowering binding energies for transition states. Since nearly all known chemistry requires a solvent, Smalley felt that Drexler's proposal to use a high vacuum environment was not feasible. However, Drexler addresses this in Nanosystems by showing mathematically that well designed catalysts can provide the effects of a solvent and can fundamentally be made even more efficient than a solvent/enzyme reaction could ever be. It is noteworthy that, contrary to Smalley's opinion that enzymes require water, "Not only do enzymes work vigorously in anhydrous organic media, but in this unnatural milieu they acquire remarkable properties such as greatly enhanced stability, radically altered substrate and enantiomeric specificities, molecular memory, and the ability to catalyse unusual reactions."

=== Redefining of the word "nanotechnology" ===
For the future, some means have to be found for MNT design evolution at the nanoscale which mimics the process of biological evolution at the molecular scale. Biological evolution proceeds by random variation in ensemble averages of organisms combined with culling of the less-successful variants and reproduction of the more-successful variants, and macroscale engineering design also proceeds by a process of design evolution from simplicity to complexity as set forth somewhat satirically by John Gall: "A complex system that works is invariably found to have evolved from a simple system that worked. . . . A complex system designed from scratch never works and can not be patched up to make it work. You have to start over, beginning with a system that works." A breakthrough in MNT is needed which proceeds from the simple atomic ensembles which can be built with, e.g., an STM to complex MNT systems via a process of design evolution. A handicap in this process is the difficulty of seeing and manipulation at the nanoscale compared to the macroscale which makes deterministic selection of successful trials difficult; in contrast biological evolution proceeds via action of what Richard Dawkins has called the "blind watchmaker" comprising random molecular variation and deterministic reproduction/extinction.

At present in 2007 the practice of nanotechnology embraces both stochastic approaches (in which, for example, supramolecular chemistry creates waterproof pants) and deterministic approaches wherein single molecules (created by stochastic chemistry) are manipulated on substrate surfaces (created by stochastic deposition methods) by deterministic methods comprising nudging them with STM or AFM probes and causing simple binding or cleavage reactions to occur. The dream of a complex, deterministic molecular nanotechnology remains elusive. Since the mid-1990s, thousands of surface scientists and thin film technocrats have latched on to the nanotechnology bandwagon and redefined their disciplines as nanotechnology. This has caused much confusion in the field and has spawned thousands of "nano"-papers on the peer reviewed literature. Most of these reports are extensions of the more ordinary research done in the parent fields.

=== The feasibility of the proposals in Nanosystems ===
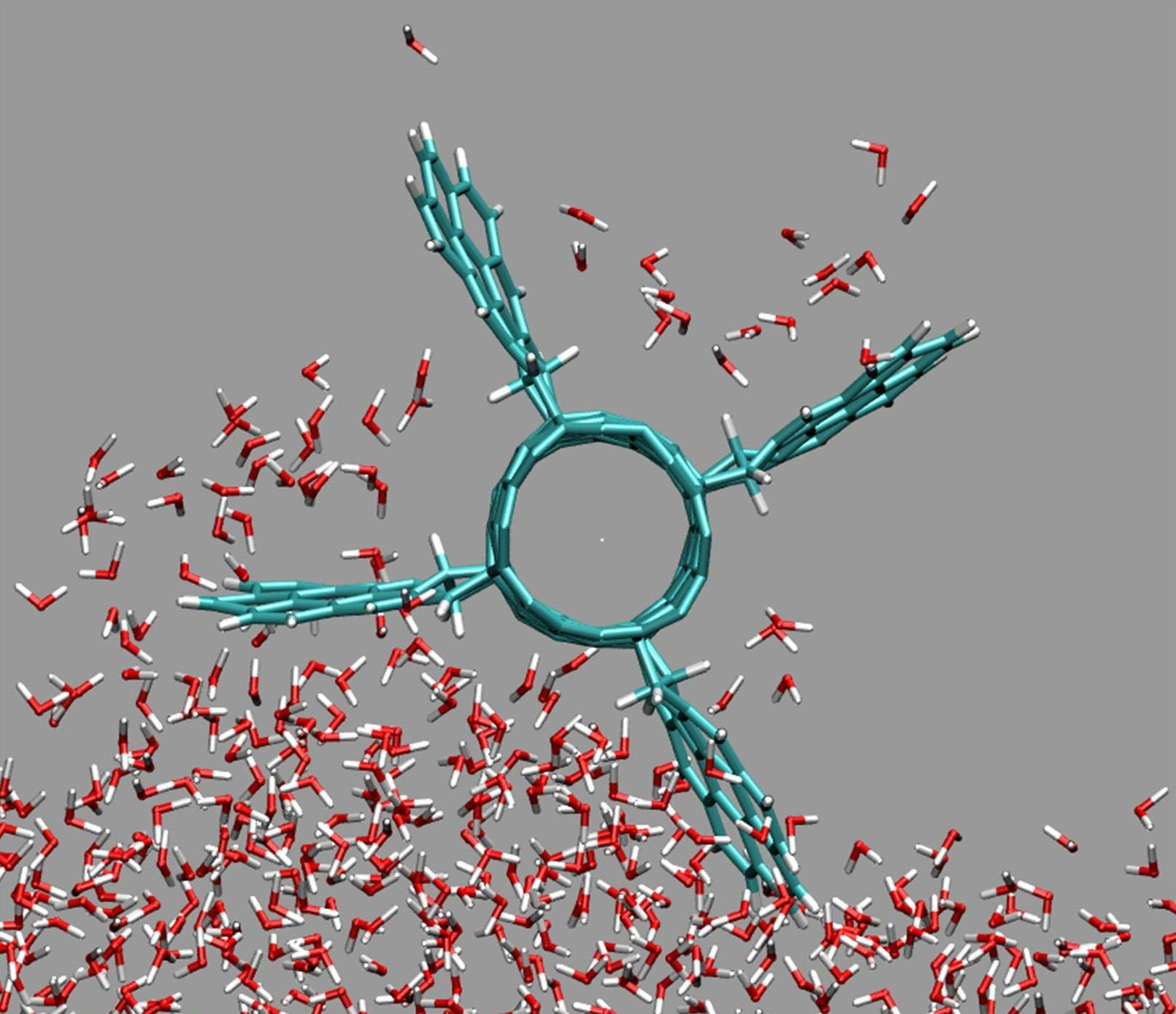
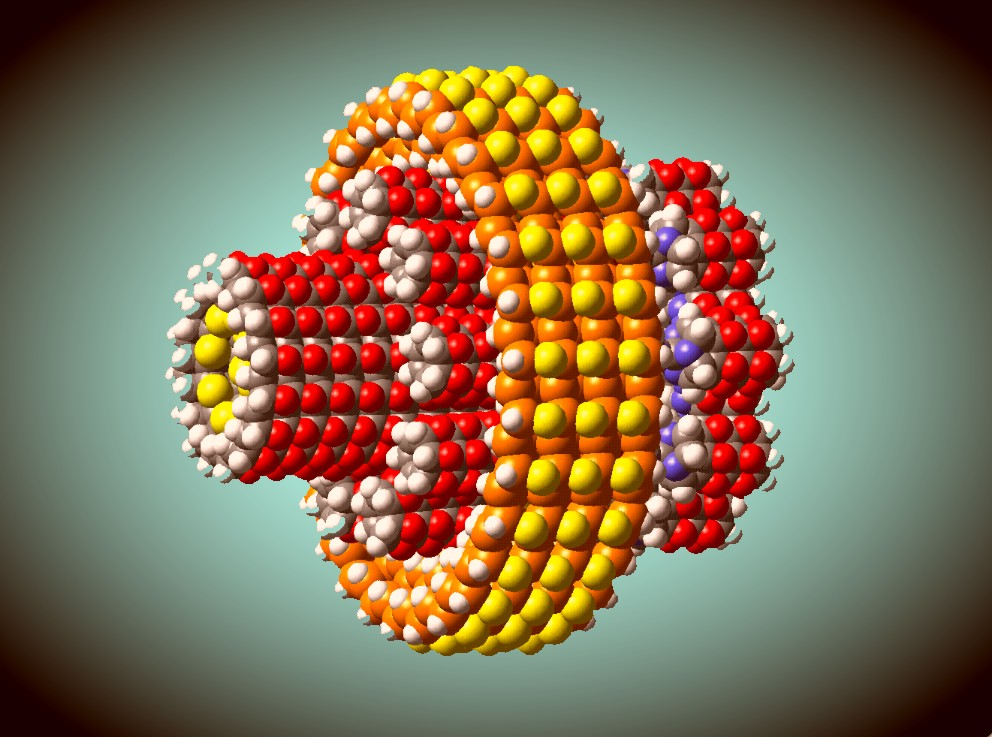
Top, a molecular propellor. Bottom, a molecular planetary gear system. The feasibility of devices like these has been questioned.

The feasibility of Drexler's proposals largely depends, therefore, on whether designs like those in Nanosystems could be built in the absence of a universal assembler to build them and would work as described. Supporters of molecular nanotechnology frequently claim that no significant errors have been discovered in Nanosystems since 1992. Even some critics concede that "Drexler has carefully considered a number of physical principles underlying the 'high level' aspects of the nanosystems he proposes and, indeed, has thought in some detail" about some issues.

Other critics claim, however, that Nanosystems omits important chemical details about the low-level 'machine language' of molecular nanotechnology. They also claim that much of the other low-level chemistry in Nanosystems requires extensive further work, and that Drexler's higher-level designs therefore rest on speculative foundations. Recent such further work by Freitas and Merkle is aimed at strengthening these foundations by filling the existing gaps in the low-level chemistry.

Drexler argues that we may need to wait until our conventional nanotechnology improves before solving these issues: "Molecular manufacturing will result from a series of advances in molecular machine systems, much as the first Moon landing resulted from a series of advances in liquid-fuel rocket systems. We are now in a position like that of the British Interplanetary Society of the 1930s which described how multistage liquid-fueled rockets could reach the Moon and pointed to early rockets as illustrations of the basic principle." However, Freitas and Merkle argue that a focused effort to achieve diamond mechanosynthesis (DMS) can begin now, using existing technology, and might achieve success in less than a decade if their "direct-to-DMS approach is pursued rather than a more circuitous development approach that seeks to implement less efficacious nondiamondoid molecular manufacturing technologies before progressing to diamondoid".

To summarize the arguments against feasibility: First, critics argue that a primary barrier to achieving molecular nanotechnology is the lack of an efficient way to create machines on a molecular/atomic scale, especially in the absence of a well-defined path toward a self-replicating assembler or diamondoid nanofactory. Advocates respond that a preliminary research path leading to a diamondoid nanofactory is being developed.

A second difficulty in reaching molecular nanotechnology is design. Hand design of a gear or bearing at the level of atoms might take a few to several weeks. While Drexler, Merkle and others have created designs of simple parts, no comprehensive design effort for anything approaching the complexity of a Model T Ford has been attempted. Advocates respond that it is difficult to undertake a comprehensive design effort in the absence of significant funding for such efforts, and that despite this handicap much useful design-ahead has nevertheless been accomplished with molecular design software and editing tools that have been developed, e.g., at Nanorex, or the newer Molecular Science and Engineering Platform One (MSEP.one).

In the latest report A Matter of Size: Triennial Review of the National Nanotechnology Initiative put out by the National Academies Press in December 2006 (roughly twenty years after Engines of Creation was published), no clear way forward toward molecular nanotechnology could yet be seen, as per the conclusion on page 108 of that report: "Although theoretical calculations can be made today, the eventually attainable range of chemical reaction cycles, error rates, speed of operation, and thermodynamic efficiencies of such bottom-up manufacturing systems cannot be reliably predicted at this time. Thus, the eventually attainable perfection and complexity of manufactured products, while they can be calculated in theory, cannot be predicted with confidence. Finally, the optimum research paths that might lead to systems which greatly exceed the thermodynamic efficiencies and other capabilities of biological systems cannot be reliably predicted at this time. Research funding that is based on the ability of investigators to produce experimental demonstrations that link to abstract models and guide long-term vision is most appropriate to achieve this goal." This call for research leading to demonstrations is welcomed by groups such as the Nanofactory Collaboration who are specifically seeking experimental successes in diamond mechanosynthesis. The "Technology Roadmap for Productive Nanosystems" aims to offer additional constructive insights.

It is perhaps interesting to ask whether or not most structures consistent with physical law can in fact be manufactured. Advocates assert that to achieve most of the vision of molecular manufacturing it is not necessary to be able to build "any structure that is compatible with natural law." Rather, it is necessary to be able to build only a sufficient (possibly modest) subset of such structures—as is true, in fact, of any practical manufacturing process used in the world today, and is true even in biology. In any event, as Richard Feynman once said, "It is scientific only to say what's more likely or less likely, and not to be proving all the time what's possible or impossible."

=== Existing work on diamond mechanosynthesis ===
There is a growing body of peer-reviewed theoretical work on synthesizing diamond by mechanically removing/adding hydrogen atoms and depositing carbon atoms (a process known as mechanosynthesis). This work is slowly permeating the broader nanoscience community and is being critiqued. For instance, Peng et al. (2006) (in the continuing research effort by Freitas, Merkle and their collaborators) reports that the most-studied mechanosynthesis tooltip motif (DCB6Ge) successfully places a C_{2} carbon dimer on a C(110) diamond surface at both 300 K (room temperature) and 80 K (liquid nitrogen temperature), and that the silicon variant (DCB6Si) also works at 80 K but not at 300 K. Over 100,000 CPU hours were invested in this latest study. The DCB6 tooltip motif, initially described by Merkle and Freitas at a Foresight Conference in 2002, was the first complete tooltip ever proposed for diamond mechanosynthesis and remains the only tooltip motif that has been successfully simulated for its intended function on a full 200-atom diamond surface.

The tooltips modeled in this work are intended to be used only in carefully controlled environments (e. g., vacuum). Maximum acceptable limits for tooltip translational and rotational misplacement errors are reported in Peng et al. (2006) -- tooltips must be positioned with great accuracy to avoid bonding the dimer incorrectly. Peng et al. (2006) reports that increasing the handle thickness from 4 support planes of C atoms above the tooltip to 5 planes decreases the resonance frequency of the entire structure from 2.0 THz to 1.8 THz. More importantly, the vibrational footprints of a DCB6Ge tooltip mounted on a 384-atom handle and of the same tooltip mounted on a similarly constrained but much larger 636-atom "crossbar" handle are virtually identical in the non-crossbar directions. More computed studies modeling still bigger handle structures are welcome, but the ability to precisely position SPM tips to the requisite atomic accuracy has been repeatedly demonstrated experimentally at low temperature, or even at room temperature constituting a basic existence proof for this capability.

Further research to consider additional tooltips will require time-consuming computational chemistry and difficult laboratory work.

A working nanofactory would require a variety of well-designed tips for different reactions, and detailed analyses of placing atoms on more complicated surfaces. Although this appears a challenging problem given current resources, many tools will be available to help future researchers: Moore's law predicts further increases in computer power, semiconductor fabrication techniques continue to approach the nanoscale, and researchers grow ever more skilled at using proteins, ribosomes and DNA to perform novel chemistry.

== Works of fiction ==
- In The Diamond Age by Neal Stephenson, diamond can be built directly out of carbon atoms. All sorts of devices from dust-size detection devices to giant diamond zeppelins are constructed atom by atom using only carbon, oxygen, nitrogen and chlorine atoms.
- In the novel Tomorrow by Andrew Saltzman (ISBN 1-4243-1027-X), a scientist uses nanorobotics to create a liquid that when inserted into the bloodstream, renders one nearly invincible given that the microscopic machines repair tissue almost instantaneously after it is damaged.
- In the roleplaying game Splicers by Palladium Books, humanity has succumbed to a "nanobot plague" that causes any object made of a non-precious metal to twist and change shape (sometimes into a type of robot) moments after being touched by a human. The object will then proceed to attack the human. This has forced humanity to develop "biotechnological" devices to replace those previously made of metal.
- On the television show Mystery Science Theater 3000, the Nanites (voiced variously by Kevin Murphy, Paul Chaplin, Mary Jo Pehl, and Bridget Jones) – are self-replicating, bio-engineered organisms that work on the ship, they are microscopic creatures that reside in the Satellite of Love's computer systems. (They are similar to the creatures in Star Trek: The Next Generation episode "Evolution", which featured "nanites" taking over the Enterprise.) The Nanites made their first appearance in season 8. Based on the concept of nanotechnology, their comical deus ex machina activities included such diverse tasks as instant repair and construction, hairstyling, performing a Nanite variation of a flea circus, conducting a microscopic war, and even destroying the Observers' planet after a dangerously vague request from Mike to "take care of [a] little problem". They also ran a microbrewery.
- Nanotechnology or "nanomachines" are referenced frequently throughout the Metal Gear Solid video game series, especially MGS2.
- Stargate Atlantis has an enemy made of self-assembling nanorobots, which also convert a planet into grey goo.
- In the novel "Prey" by Michael Crichton, self replicating nanobots create autonomous nano-swarms with predatory behaviors. The protagonist must stop the swarm before it evolves into a grey goo plague.
- In the films Avengers: Infinity War and Avengers: Endgame, Tony Stark's Iron Man suit was constructed using nanotechnology.

== See also ==
- Nanochemistry
- Green nanotechnology
- Technomimetics

== Reference works ==
- The primary technical reference work on this topic is Nanosystems: Molecular Machinery, Manufacturing, and Computation, an in-depth, physics-based analysis of a particular class of potential nanomachines and molecular manufacturing systems, with extensive analyses of their feasibility and performance. Nanosystems is closely based on Drexler's MIT doctoral dissertation, "Molecular Machinery and Manufacturing with Applications to Computation". Both works also discuss technology development pathways that begin with scanning probe and biomolecular technologies.
- Drexler and others extended the ideas of molecular nanotechnology with several other books. Unbounding the Future: the Nanotechnology Revolution is an easy-to-read book that introduces the ideas of molecular nanotechnology in a less technical form. Other notable works in the same vein are Freitas, Robert (1996–2022). Nanomedicine Vol. I and Vol. IIA. Landes Bioscience. and Freitas, Robert; Merkle, Ralph (2004). Kinematic Self-Replicating Machines (KSRM). Landes Bioscience – via Molecularassembler.com.
- Crandall, B. C., ed. (25 July 1996). Nanotechnology: Molecular Speculations on Global Abundance. MIT Press. ISBN 978-0-262-53137-5. Explains interesting ideas for MNT applications.
