= Chemists Without Borders =

Non-governmental organization

- Abbreviation: CWB
- Formation: 2004
- Type: INGO
- Region served: Worldwide
- Official language: English
- Website: CWB Official website

Chemists Without Borders is a non-governmental organization involved in international development work designed to solve humanitarian problems through chemistry and related activities. As a public benefit, non-profit organization, the primary goals of Chemists Without Borders include:

- providing affordable medicines and vaccines to those who need them most
- providing clean water through water purification technologies
- supporting sustainable energy technologies
- encouraging open access to scholarly chemistry research articles throughout the world
- advocating a better understanding of chemistry through education

Chemists Without Borders was founded in 2004 by Bego Gerber and Steve Chambreau as a result of a letter that Gerber sent to the editor of Chemical and Engineering News in September 2004.

== See also ==
- Appropriate technology
