= Chris Phoenix (nanotechnologist) =

Chris Phoenix (born December 25, 1970) is the co-founder (with Mike Treder) and Director of Research of the Center for Responsible Nanotechnology (CRN), and has worked in the field of advanced nanotechnology for over 15 years. He obtained his BS in Symbolic Systems and MS in Computer Science from Stanford University in 1991. Since 2000, he has studied and written about molecular manufacturing. Phoenix, who lives in northern California, is a published author in nanotechnology and nanomedical research best known for his peer-reviewed paper, "Design of a Primitive Nanofactory", as well as his comprehensive outline of Thirty Essential Nanotechnology Studies. Phoenix has authored or co-authored many papers and essays published by the Society in connection with his work for CRN.

Phoenix also serves on the Scientific Advisory Board for Nanorex, Inc.
