= Richard Smalley =

American chemist and Nobel laureate (1943–2005)

Richard Errett Smalley
- Richard Errett Smalley
- Born: June 6, 1943; Akron, Ohio, U.S.
- Died: October 28, 2005 (aged 62); Houston, Texas, U.S.
- Education: Hope College; University of Michigan; Princeton University
- Known for: buckminsterfullerene
- Awards: Irving Langmuir Award (1991); E. O. Lawrence Award (1991); EPS Europhysics Prize (1994); Nobel Prize in Chemistry (1996)
- Scientific career
- Workplaces: Rice University; University of Chicago
- Thesis: The lower electronic states of 1,3,5 symtriazine (1974)
- Doctoral advisor: Elliot R. Bernstein

Richard Errett Smalley (June 6, 1943 – October 28, 2005) was an American chemist who was the Gene and Norman Hackerman Professor of Chemistry, Physics, and Astronomy at Rice University. In 1996, along with Robert Curl, also a professor of chemistry at Rice, and Harold Kroto, a professor at the University of Sussex, he was awarded the Nobel Prize in Chemistry for the discovery of a new form of carbon, buckminsterfullerene, also known as buckyballs. He was an advocate of nanotechnology and its applications.

== Early life and education ==
Smalley, the youngest of 4 siblings, was born in Akron, Ohio on June 6, 1943, to Frank Dudley Smalley, Jr., and Esther Virginia Rhoads. He grew up in Kansas City, Missouri. Richard Smalley credits his father, mother and aunt as formative influences in industry, science and chemistry. His father, Frank Dudley Smalley, Jr. worked with mechanical and electrical equipment and eventually became CEO of a trade journal for farm implements called Implement and Tractor. His mother, Esther Rhoads Smalley, completed her B.A. Degree while Richard was a teenager. She was particularly inspired by mathematician Norman N. Royall Jr., who taught Foundations of Physical Science, and communicated her love of science to her son through long conversations and joint activities. Smalley's maternal aunt, pioneering female chemist Sara Jane Rhoads, interested Smalley in the field of chemistry, letting him work in her organic chemistry laboratory, and suggesting that he attend Hope College, which had a strong chemistry program.

Smalley attended Hope College for two years before transferring to the University of Michigan where he received his Bachelor of Science in 1965, performing undergraduate research in the laboratory of Raoul Kopelman. Between his studies, he also worked in industry, where he developed his unique managerial style. He received his Ph.D. from Princeton University in 1973 after completing a doctoral dissertation, titled "The lower electronic states of 1,3,5 (sym)-triazine", under the supervision of Elliot R. Bernstein. He did postdoctoral work at the University of Chicago from 1973 to 1976, with Donald Levy and Lennard Wharton where he was a pioneer in the development of supersonic beam laser spectroscopy.

== Career ==
In 1976, Smalley joined Rice University. In 1982, he was appointed to the Gene and Norman Hackerman Chair in Chemistry at Rice. He helped to found the Rice Quantum Institute in 1979, serving as chairman from 1986 to 1996. In 1990, he became also a professor in the department of physics. In 1990, he helped to found the Center for Nanoscale Science and Technology. In 1996, he was appointed its director.

He became a member of the National Academy of Sciences in 1990, and the American Academy of Arts and Sciences in 1991.

=== Fullerenes ===
Smalley's research in physical chemistry investigated the formation of inorganic and semiconductor clusters using pulsed molecular beams and time-of-flight mass spectrometry. As a consequence of this expertise, Robert Curl introduced him to Harry Kroto in order to investigate a question about the constituents of astronomical dust. These are carbon-rich grains expelled by old stars such as R Coronae Borealis. The result of this collaboration was the discovery of C_{60} (known as Buckyballs) and the fullerenes as the third allotropic form of carbon.

Smalley recognized that the structure of C_{60} was like that of a soccer ball after cutting and tapping hexagons together in a three-dimensional manner, utilizing 20 hexagons and 12 pentagons. He was also responsible for the name of C_{60}, naming it after Buckminster Fuller, an American architect who was known for his use of geodesic domes in his designs.

The research that earned Kroto, Smalley and Curl the Nobel Prize mostly comprised three articles. First was the discovery of C_{60} in the November 14, 1985, issue of Nature, "C_{60}: Buckminsterfullerene". The second article detailed the discovery of the endohedral fullerenes in "Lanthanum Complexes of Spheroidal Carbon Shells" in the Journal of the American Chemical Society (1985). The third announced the discovery of the fullerenes in "Reactivity of Large Carbon Clusters: Spheroidal Carbon Shells and Their Possible Relevance to the Formation and Morphology of Soot" in the Journal of Physical Chemistry (1986).

Although only three people can be cited for a Nobel Prize, graduate students James R. Heath, Yuan Liu, and Sean C. O'Brien participated in the work. Smalley mentioned Heath and O'Brien in his Nobel Lecture. Heath went on to become a professor at the California Institute of Technology (Caltech) and O'Brien joined Texas Instruments and is now at MEMtronics. Yuan Liu is a Senior Staff Scientist at Oak Ridge National Laboratory.

This research is significant for the discovery of a new allotrope of carbon known as a fullerene. Other allotropes of carbon include graphite, diamond and graphene. Harry Kroto's 1985 paper entitled "C60: Buckminsterfullerine", published with colleagues J. R. Heath, S. C. O'Brien, R. F. Curl, and R. E. Smalley, was honored by a Citation for Chemical Breakthrough Award from the Division of History of Chemistry of the American Chemical Society, presented to Rice University in 2015. The discovery of fullerenes was recognized in 2010 by the designation of a National Historic Chemical Landmark by the American Chemical Society at the Richard E. Smalley Institute for Nanoscale Science and Technology at Rice University in Houston, Texas.

=== Nanotechnology ===
Following nearly a decade's worth of research into the formation of alternate fullerene compounds (e.g. C_{28}, C_{70}), as well as the synthesis of endohedral metallofullerenes (M@C_{60}), reports of the identification of carbon nanotube structures led Smalley to begin investigating their iron-catalyzed synthesis.

As a consequence of this research, Smalley was able to persuade the administration of Rice University, under then-president Malcolm Gillis, to create Rice's Center for Nanoscale Science and Technology (CNST) focusing on any aspect of molecular nanotechnology. It was renamed The Richard E. Smalley Institute for Nanoscale Science and Technology after Smalley's death in 2005, and has since merged with the Rice Quantum Institute, becoming the Smalley-Curl Institute (SCI) in 2015.

Smalley's latest research was focused on carbon nanotubes, specifically focusing on the chemical synthesis side of nanotube research. He is well known for his group's invention of the high-pressure carbon monoxide (HiPco) method of producing large batches of high-quality nanotubes. Smalley spun off his work into a company, Carbon Nanotechnologies Inc. and associated nanotechnologies.

Smalley and his lab worked solely in this area of study and nothing else for approximately 10 years, up until the end of his life. His research lab carried the slogan "If it ain't tubes, we don't do it" proudly.

=== Dispute on molecular assemblers ===
He was an outspoken skeptic of the idea of molecular assemblers, as advocated by K. Eric Drexler. His main scientific objections, which he termed the "fat fingers problem" and the "sticky fingers problem", argued against the feasibility of molecular assemblers being able to precisely select and place individual atoms. He also believed that Drexler's speculations about apocalyptic dangers of molecular assemblers threatened the public support for development of nanotechnology. He debated Drexler in an exchange of letters which were published in Chemical & Engineering News as a point-counterpoint feature.

== Advocacy ==
Starting in the late 1990s, Smalley advocated for the need for cheap, sustainable energy, which he described as the number one problem facing humanity in the 21st century. He described what he called "The Terawatt Challenge", the need to develop a new power source capable of increasing "our energy output by a minimum factor of two, the generally agreed-upon number, certainly by the middle of the century, but preferably well before that."

He also presented a list entitled "Top Ten Problems of Humanity for Next 50 Years". It can be interesting to compare his list, in order of priority, to the Ten Threats formulated by the U.N.'s High Level Threat Panel in 2004. Smalley's list, in order of priority, was:

1. Energy
2. Water
3. Food
4. Environment
5. Poverty
6. Terrorism & war
7. Disease
8. Education
9. Democracy
10. Population

Smalley regarded several problems as interlinked: the lack of people entering the fields of science and engineering, the need for an alternative to fossil fuels, and the need to address global warming. He felt that improved science education was essential, and strove to encourage young students to consider careers in science. His slogan for this effort was "Be a scientist, save the world."

Smalley was a leading advocate of the National Nanotechnology Initiative in 2003. Suffering from hair loss and weakness as a result of his chemotherapy treatments, Smalley testified before the congressional testimonies, arguing for the potential benefits of nanotechnology in the development of targeted cancer therapies. Bill 189, the 21st Century Nanotechnology Research and Development Act, was introduced in the Senate on January 16, 2003, by Senator Ron Wyden, passed the Senate on November 18, 2003, and at the House of Representatives the next day with a 405–19 vote. President George W. Bush signed the act into law on December 3, 2003, as Public Law 108- 153. Smalley was invited to attend.

== Personal life ==
Smalley was married four times, to Judith Grace Sampieri (1968–1978), Mary L. Chapieski (1980–1994), JoNell M. Chauvin (1997–1998) and Deborah Sheffield (2005), and had two sons, Chad Richard Smalley (born June 8, 1969) and Preston Reed Smalley (born August 8, 1997).

In 1999, Smalley was diagnosed with cancer. Smalley died of leukemia, variously reported as non-Hodgkin's lymphoma and chronic lymphocytic leukemia, on October 28, 2005, at M.D. Anderson Cancer Center in Houston, Texas, at the age of 62.

Upon Smalley's death, the US Senate passed a resolution to honor Smalley, crediting him as the "Father of Nanotechnology."

=== Religion during final years ===
Smalley, who had taken classes in religion as well as science at Hope College, rediscovered his religious foundation in later life, particularly during his final years while battling cancer. During the final year of his life, Smalley wrote: "Although I suspect I will never fully understand, I now think the answer is very simple: it's true. God did create the universe about 13.7 billion years ago, and of necessity has involved Himself with His creation ever since."

At the Tuskegee University's 79th Annual Scholarship Convocation/Parents' Recognition Program he was quoted making the following statement regarding the subject of evolution while urging his audience to take seriously their role as the higher species on this planet. "'Genesis' was right, and there was a creation, and that Creator is still involved ... We are the only species that can destroy the Earth or take care of it and nurture all that live on this very special planet. I'm urging you to look on these things. For whatever reason, this planet was built specifically for us. Working on this planet is an absolute moral code. ... Let's go out and do what we were put on Earth to do." Old Earth creationist and astronomer Hugh Ross spoke at Smalley's funeral, November 2, 2005.

== Publications ==
- Smalley, R.E. "Supersonic bare metal cluster beams. Final report", Rice University, United States Department of Energy—Office of Energy Research, (October 14, 1997).
- Smalley, R.E. "Supersonic Bare Metal Cluster Beams. Technical Progress Report, March 16, 1984 – April 1, 1985", Rice University, United States Department of Energy—Office of Basic Energy Sciences, (January 1, 1985).

== Honors ==
=== Fellowships ===
- Harold W. Dodds Fellow, Princeton University, 1973
- Alfred P. Sloan Fellow, 1978–1980
- Fellow of the American Physical Society, 1987
- Fellow of the American Association for the Advancement of Science, 2003

=== Awards and prizes ===
- Irving Langmuir Prize in Chemical Physics, American Physical Society, 1991
- Popular Science Magazine Grand Award in Science & Technology, 1991
- APS International Prize for New Materials, 1992 (Joint with R. F. Curl & H. W. Kroto)
- Ernest O. Lawrence Memorial Award, U.S. Department of Energy, 1992
- Welch Award in Chemistry, Robert A. Welch Foundation, 1992
- Auburn-G.M. Kosolapoff Award, Auburn Section, American Chemical Society, 1992
- Southwest Regional Award, American Chemical Society, 1992
- William H. Nichols Medal, New York Section, American Chemical Society, 1993
- The John Scott Award, City of Philadelphia, 1993
- Hewlett-Packard Europhysics Prize, European Physical Society, 1994 (with Wolfgang Kraetschmer, Don Huffman and Harold Kroto)
- Harrison Howe Award, Rochester Section, American Chemical Society, 1994
- Madison Marshall Award, North Alabama Section, American Chemical Society, 1995
- Franklin Medal, The Franklin Institute, 1996
- Nobel Prize in Chemistry, Royal Swedish Academy of Sciences, 1996
- Distinguished Civilian Public Service Award, Department of the Navy, 1997
- American Carbon Society Medal, 1997
- Top 75 Distinguished Contributors, Chemical & Engineering News, 1998
- Lifetime Achievement Award, Small Times Magazine, 2003
- Glenn T. Seaborg Medal, University of California at Los Angeles, 2002
- Distinguished Alumni Award, Hope College, 2005
- 50th Anniversary Visionary Award, SPIE – International Society for Optical Engineering, 2005
- National Historic Chemical Landmark, American Chemical Society, 2010
- Citation for Chemical Breakthrough Award, Division of History of Chemistry, American Chemical Society, 2015
