= Homer Jacobson =

American chemistry professor

Homer Jacobson is a former chemistry professor at Brooklyn College, New York City.

In the 1950s he illustrated basic self-replication in artificial life with a model train set. A seed "organism" consisting of a "head" and "tail" boxcar could use the simple rules of the system to consistently create new "organisms" identical to itself, so long as there was a random pool of new boxcars to draw from.

In 1955 he published "Information, Reproduction and the Origin of Life," in American Scientist. In 2007, he retracted two passages of this work after realizing that errors in his paper were being misread as evidence for creationism.

== Articles ==
- "Virustat, a Device for Continuous Production of Viruses," Applied Microbiology, 14(6): 940–952 (1966 November) with Leslie S. Jacobson.
- "The Informational Capacity of the Human Eye," Science 113:292-293 (March 16, 1951).
- "The Informational Capacity of the Human Ear," Science 112:143-144 (August 4, 1950).
- "The informational content of mechanisms and circuits," Information and Control, 2(3):285-296, September 1959.
- "On Models of Reproduction," American Scientist 46(1958):255-284.
- "Information, Reproduction and the Origin of Life," American Scientist, p. 125 (January 1955)
  - Retraction of two passages: Letter to the editor, American Scientist (November–December 2007)
