= Technomimetics =

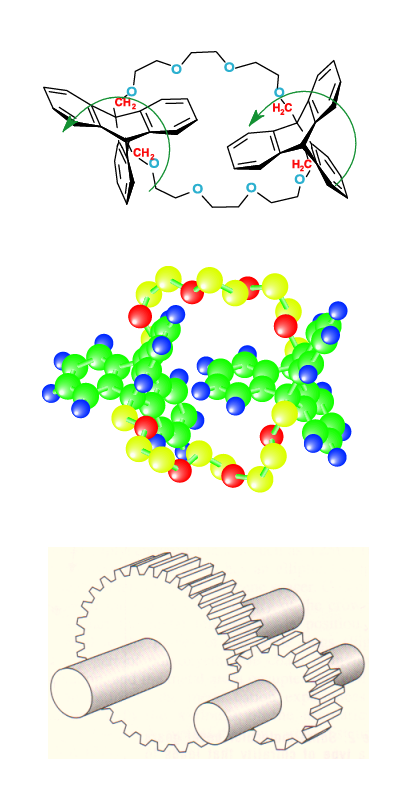
A Molecular Gearing System.

Technomimetics are molecular systems that can mimic man-made devices. The term was first introduced in 1997. The current set of technomimetic molecules includes motors, rotors, gears, gyroscopes, tweezers, and other molecular devices. Technomimetics can be considered as the essential components of molecular machines and have the primary use in molecular nanotechnology.

== See also ==
- Molecular tweezers
