= Gray goo =

Hypothetical end-of-the-world scenario

Gray goo (also spelled as grey goo) is a hypothetical global catastrophic scenario involving molecular nanotechnology in which out-of-control self-replicating machines consume all biomass (and perhaps also everything else) on Earth while building many more of themselves, a scenario that has been called ecophagy. The original idea assumed machines were designed to have this capability, while popularizations have assumed that machines might somehow gain this capability by accident.

Self-replicating machines of the macroscopic variety were originally described by mathematician John von Neumann, and are sometimes referred to as von Neumann machines or clanking replicators. The term gray goo was coined by nanotechnology pioneer K. Eric Drexler in his 1986 book Engines of Creation. In 2004, he stated "I wish I had never used the term 'gray goo'," arguing that it had inspired public fears that interfered with research on more conventional, non-self replicating nanotechnology. Engines of Creation mentions "gray goo" as a thought experiment in two paragraphs and a note, while the popularized idea of gray goo was first publicized in a mass-circulation magazine, Omni, in November 1986.

== Definition ==
The term was first used by molecular nanotechnology pioneer K. Eric Drexler in Engines of Creation (1986). In Chapter 4, Engines Of Abundance, Drexler illustrates both exponential growth and inherent limits (not gray goo) by describing "dry" nanomachines that can function only if given special raw materials:

Imagine such a replicator floating in a bottle of chemicals, making copies of itself...the first replicator assembles a copy in one thousand seconds, the two replicators then build two more in the next thousand seconds, the four build another four, and the eight build another eight. At the end of ten hours, there are not thirty-six new replicators, but over 68 billion. In less than a day, they would weigh a ton; in less than two days, they would outweigh the Earth; in another four hours, they would exceed the mass of the Sun and all the planets combined — if the bottle of chemicals hadn't run dry long before.

According to Drexler, the term was popularized by an article in science fiction magazine Omni, which also popularized the term "nanotechnology" in the same issue. Drexler says arms control is a far greater issue than gray goo "nanobugs".

Drexler describes gray goo in Chapter 11 of Engines of Creation:

Early assembler-based replicators could beat the most advanced modern organisms. 'Plants' with 'leaves' no more efficient than today's solar cells could out-compete real plants, crowding the biosphere with an inedible foliage. Tough, omnivorous 'bacteria' could out-compete real bacteria: they could spread like blowing pollen, replicate swiftly, and reduce the biosphere to dust in a matter of days. Dangerous replicators could easily be too tough, small, and rapidly spreading to stop — at least if we made no preparation. We have trouble enough controlling viruses and fruit flies.

Drexler notes that the geometric (exponential) growth made possible by self-replication is inherently limited by the availability of suitable raw materials. Drexler used the term "gray goo" not to indicate color or texture, but to emphasize the difference between "superiority" in terms of human values and "superiority" in terms of competitive success:

Though masses of uncontrolled replicators need not be grey or gooey, the term "grey goo" emphasizes that replicators able to obliterate life might be less inspiring than a single species of crabgrass. They might be "superior" in an evolutionary sense, but this need not make them valuable.

Bill Joy, one of the founders of Sun Microsystems, discussed some of the problems with pursuing this technology in his now-famous 2000 article in Wired magazine, titled "Why The Future Doesn't Need Us". In direct response to Joy's concerns, the first quantitative technical analysis of the ecophagy scenario was published in 2000 by nanomedicine pioneer Robert Freitas.

== Risks and precautions ==
Drexler more recently conceded that there is no need to build anything that even resembles a potential runaway replicator. This would avoid the problem entirely. In a paper in the journal Nanotechnology, he argues that self-replicating machines are needlessly complex and inefficient. His 1992 technical book on advanced nanotechnologies Nanosystems: Molecular Machinery, Manufacturing, and Computation describes manufacturing systems that are desktop-scale factories with specialized machines in fixed locations and conveyor belts to move parts from place to place. None of these measures would prevent a party from creating a weaponized gray goo, were such a thing possible.

King Charles III (then Prince of Wales) called upon the British Royal Society to investigate the "enormous environmental and social risks" of nanotechnology in a planned report, leading to much media commentary on gray goo. The Royal Society's report on nanoscience was released on 29 July 2004, and declared the possibility of self-replicating machines to lie too far in the future to be of concern to regulators.

More recent analysis in the paper titled Safe Exponential Manufacturing from the Institute of Physics (co-written by Chris Phoenix, Director of Research of the Center for Responsible Nanotechnology, and Eric Drexler), shows that the danger of gray goo is far less likely than originally thought. However, other long-term major risks to society and the environment from nanotechnology have been identified. Drexler has made a somewhat public effort to retract his gray goo hypothesis, in an effort to focus the debate on more realistic threats associated with knowledge-enabled nanoterrorism and other misuses.

In Safe Exponential Manufacturing, which was published in a 2004 issue of Nanotechnology, it was suggested that creating manufacturing systems with the ability to self-replicate by the use of their own energy sources would not be needed. The Foresight Institute also recommended embedding controls in the molecular machines. These controls would be able to prevent anyone from purposely abusing nanotechnology, and therefore avoid the gray goo scenario.

== Ethics and chaos ==
Gray goo is a useful construct for considering low-probability, high-impact outcomes from emerging technologies. Thus, it is a useful tool in the ethics of technology. Daniel A. Vallero applied it as a worst-case scenario thought experiment for technologists contemplating possible risks from advancing a technology. This requires that a decision tree or event tree include even extremely low probability events if such events may have an extremely negative and irreversible consequence, i.e. application of the precautionary principle. Dianne Irving admonishes that "any error in science will have a rippling effect". Vallero adapted this reference to chaos theory to emerging technologies, wherein slight permutations of initial conditions can lead to unforeseen and profoundly negative downstream effects, for which the technologist and the new technology's proponents must be held accountable.

== In popular culture ==
- An early exploration of a concept similar to gray goo appears in Stanisław Lem's 1964 novel The Invincible. The story features a planet, Regis III, that is dominated by an ecosystem of self-replicating micro-robots. These machines, having undergone a form of mechanical evolution ("necroevolution"), can form vast swarms that act as a collective intelligence, effectively consuming or neutralizing any threat. This depiction of an out-of-control, evolving, and ecologically dominant swarm of machines predates the coining of the term "gray goo" by over two decades.
- Grey goo is the basis for "Benderama", an episode of the animated science fiction sitcom Futurama. In this episode, Bender creates smaller copies of himself to accomplish mundane tasks, which quickly spirals out of control as those copies begin replicating themselves, eventually reaching a stage where the copies are small enough to manipulate matter at the subatomic level.
- The Horizon video game series is set in the post-apocalyptic aftermath of a grey goo scenario, in which a self-replicating swarm of insectoid robots consumes the Earth's biosphere, rendering all life on the planet extinct. Humanity survives only through an automated terraforming system that revives the species centuries later, with people reduced to living in scattered, primitive tribes.
- The plot of the novel Prey by Michael Crichton centers around self-replicating nanobots, which the protagonist attempts to stop before they evolve beyond control.
- The video game series Tasty Planet revolves around nanotechnology designed as a cleaning product, which begins to self-replicate and consume everything on the planet.
- The 1985 science fiction novel Blood Music features biological computers created from lymphocyte cells. Smuggled out of a laboratory, the cells multiply and evolve rapidly, eventually assimilating much of the biosphere of North America.
- The Sonic the Hedgehog comic series included a 21-issue story arc known as the "Metal Virus Saga". The Metal Virus is depicted as a grey goo scenario that converts all organic life into machines. It replicates and mutates like a virus, turning sentient beings into zombie-like robots who spread the infection by touch.
- The short story "Galactic North" by Alastair Reynolds features an interstellar cloud of von Neumann machines, referred to as "Greenfly". The Greenfly devours and converts all matter in its path, and is expected to eventually consume the universe.
- In the Expanse series, the Protomolecule are nanomachines sent out by an alien hive intelligence at sublight speeds to other systems, seeking out new life-bearing worlds to assimilate, replicate, repurpose their resources, and to report back to the central network by constructing new wormhole gates. While still dangerous, the Protomolecule differs from the gray goo scenario in the way that it cannot replicate purely with inorganic matter, instead it requires direct access to living biomass and radiation sources to grow, and once the Protomolecule serves its purpose, it renders itself inert.
- The incremental web game Universal Paperclips features an AI whose sole objective is to create more paperclips, ultimately converting all matter in the universe into paperclips.
- The Apple TV+ series Silo depicts a gray goo scenario in which self-replicating nanomachines render the Earth's surface uninhabitable, forcing survivors to live in underground silos.
- The popular computer game "Sandboxels" also features a "Gray Goo", but exaggerates its speed, further adding to the irrational fear off theses devices.

== See also ==
- Alkahest – Theorized universal solvent in alchemy
- Astrochicken – Astrophysical thought experiment by Freeman Dyson
- Cat's Cradle – 1963 novel by Kurt Vonnegut
- Microswimmer – Microscopic object able to traverse fluid
- Molecular machine – Molecular-scale artificial or biological device
- Paperclip maximizer – Hypothesis about intelligent agents
- Programmable matter – Matter which can change its physical properties in a programmable fashion
- Roko's basilisk – AI thought experiment
- Self-replicating machine – Device able to make copies of itself
- Self-reconfiguring modular robot – Robot that can rearrange its own parts
- Smartdust – System of microelectromechanical devices
- Synthetic biology – Interdisciplinary branch of biology and engineering
- Utility fog – Concept of a swarm of tiny robots
