= Chemical & Engineering News =

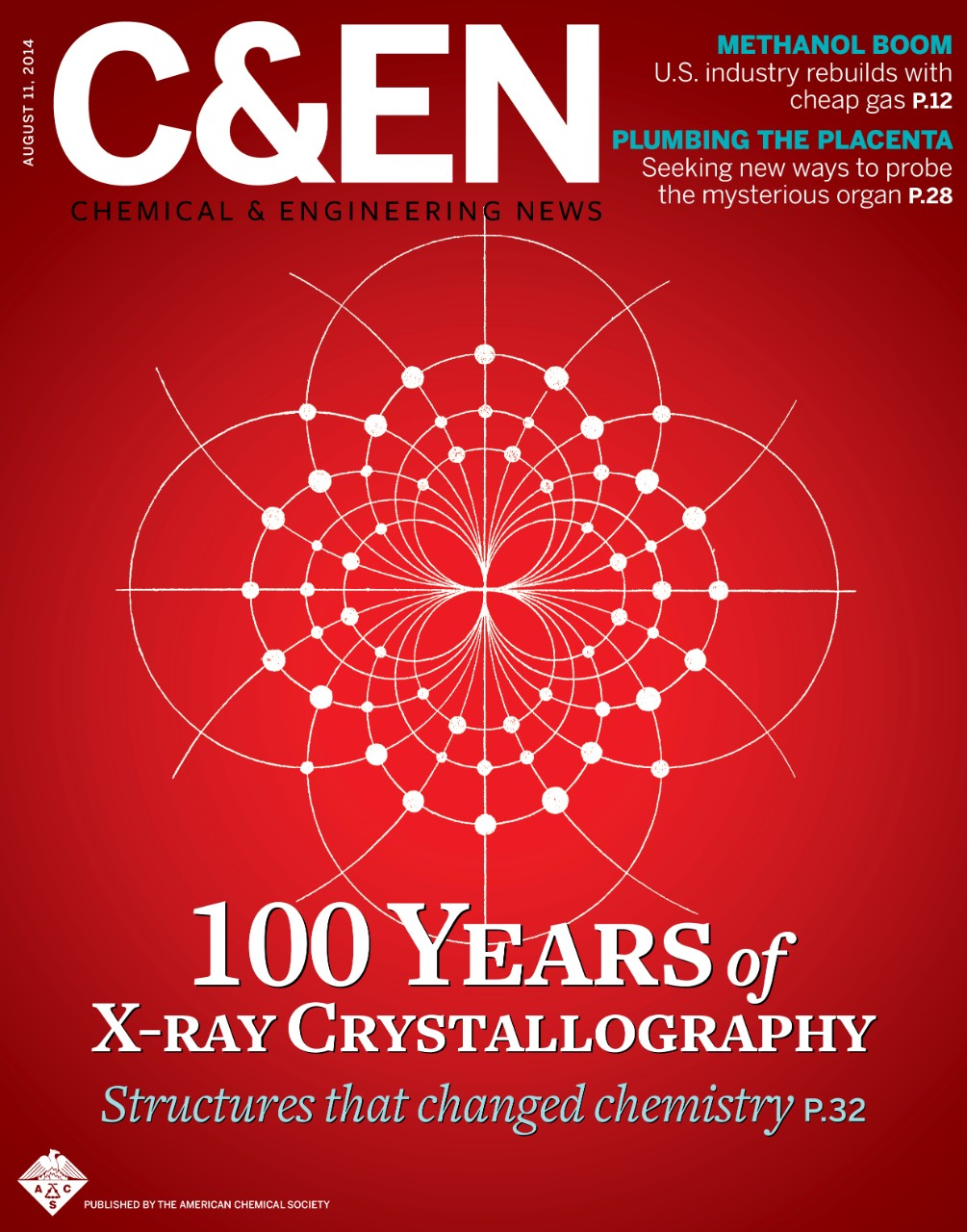
- Discipline: Chemistry, chemical engineering
- Language: English

Publication details
- History: 1923-present
- Publisher: American Chemical Society (United States)
- Frequency: Weekly
- Impact factor: 1.126 (2015)

Standard abbreviations
- ISO 4: Chem. Eng. News

Indexing
- CODEN: CENEAR
- ISSN: 0009-2347 (print); 1520-605X (web)
- LCCN: a41002413
- OCLC no.: 567617114

Links
- Journal homepage; Online access

Chemical & Engineering News (C&EN) is a monthly news magazine published by the American Chemical Society (ACS), providing professional and technical news and analysis in the fields of chemistry and chemical engineering. It includes information on recent news and research in these fields, career and employment information, business and industry news, government and policy news, funding in these fields, and special reports. The magazine is available to all members of the American Chemical Society. The ACS also publishes C&EN Global Enterprise (ISSN 2474-7408), an online resource that republishes articles from C&EN for easier online access to content.

== History ==
The magazine was established in 1923, and has been on the internet since 1998.

The editor-in-chief is Nick Ishmael Perkins.

== Abstracting and indexing ==
The magazine is abstracted and indexed in Chemical Abstracts Service, Science Citation Index, and Scopus.
