= Robert Freitas =

American nanotechnologist (born 1952)

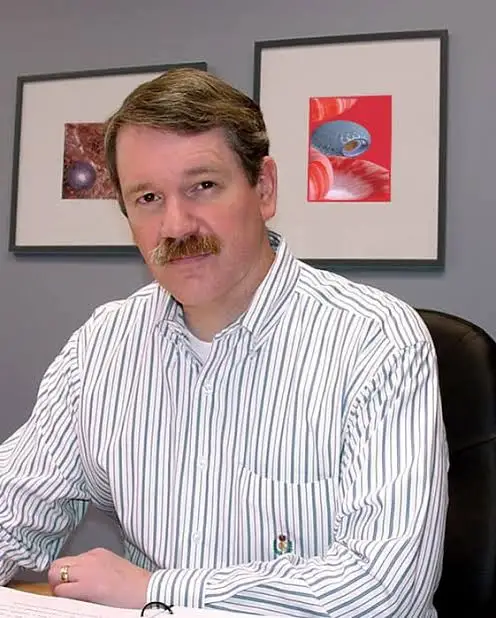
- Robert at Zyvex in 2002
- Born: Robert A. Freitas Jr. 1952 (age 73–74); Camden, Maine, U.S.
- Education: Harvey Mudd College (BSc); Santa Clara University School of Law (JD)
- Occupation: Nanotechnologist
- Spouse: Nancy (m. 1974)
- Awards: Feynman Prize in Nanotechnology (2009)
- Scientific career
- Fields: Nanotechnology
- Website: www.rfreitas.com

Robert A. Freitas Jr. (born 1952) is an American nanotechnologist.

== Early life and education ==
Freitas was born in Camden, Maine. His father worked in agriculture, and his mother was a homemaker. Freitas married Nancy, his childhood sweetheart, in 1974.

In 1974, Freitas earned a bachelor's degree in physics and psychology from Harvey Mudd College. In 1978, he received a Juris Doctor (J.D.) degree from the Santa Clara University School of Law. He has written over 150 technical papers, book chapters, and popular articles on scientific, engineering, and legal topics.

== Career ==
Freitas' interests include nanorobotics, how nanotechnology can extend the life of humans, self-replicating machines, and cryonics.

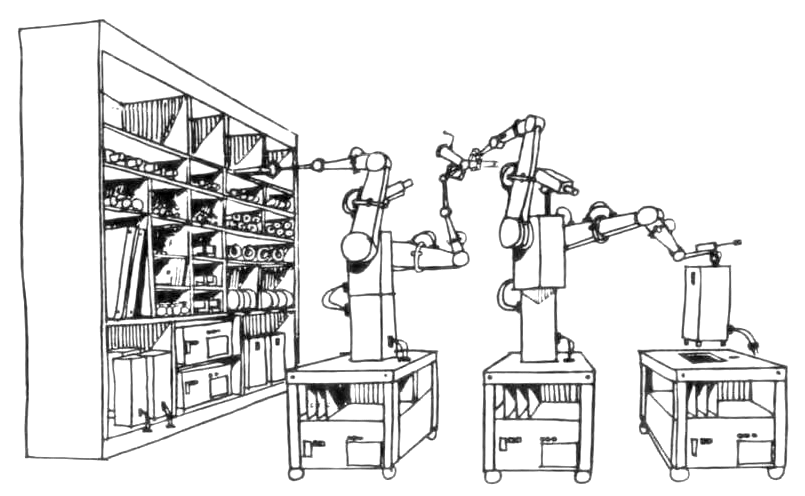
Figure 5.29.— proposed demonstration of simple robot self-replication in "Advanced Automation for Space Missions"

Freitas introduced the concept of "sentience quotient" in the late 1970s.

In 1980, Freitas and William Gilbreath were participants in a NASA study regarding "Advanced Automation for Space Missions," and presented the feasibility of self-replicating machines in space, using advanced artificial intelligence and automation technologies.

Freitas began writing his Nanomedicine book series in 1994. Volume I was published in October 1999 by Landes Bioscience while Freitas was a Research Fellow at the Institute for Molecular Manufacturing. Volume IIA was published in October 2003 by Landes Bioscience.

In 2004, Freitas and Ralph Merkle coauthored and published Kinematic Self-Replicating Machines, a comprehensive survey of the field of physical and hypothetical self-replicating machines.

In 2009, Freitas was awarded the Feynman Prize in theoretical nanotechnology. Afterwards, he was granted the first patent for a mechanosynthesis tool, which he developed while working at Zyvex. The tool is theoretically to be used in molecular engineering.

== See also ==
- Ecophagy

== Bibliography ==
- Robert A. Freitas Jr., Nanomedicine, Volume I: Basic Capabilities (Landes Bioscience, 1999) ISBN 1-57059-645-X
- Robert A. Freitas Jr., Nanomedicine, Vol. IIA: Biocompatibility (Landes Bioscience, 2003) ISBN 1-57059-700-6
- Robert A. Freitas Jr., Ralph C. Merkle, Kinematic Self-Replicating Machines (Landes Bioscience, 2004) ISBN 1-57059-690-5
- Robert A. Freitas Jr., Nanomedicine: Biocompatibility (S Karger Pub, 2004) ISBN 3-8055-7722-2
- Robert A. Freitas Jr., Cryostasis Revival: The Recovery of Cryonics Patients through Nanomedicine (Alcor Life Extension Foundation, 2022) ISBN 978-0-9968153-5-2
