= History of nanotechnology =

The history of nanotechnology traces the development of the concepts and experimental work falling under the broad category of nanotechnology. Although nanotechnology is a relatively recent development in scientific research, the development of its central concepts happened over a longer period of time. The emergence of nanotechnology in the 1980s was caused by the convergence of experimental advances such as the invention of the scanning tunneling microscope in 1981 and the discovery of fullerenes in 1985, with the elucidation and popularization of a conceptual framework for the goals of nanotechnology beginning with the 1986 publication of the book Engines of Creation. The field was subject to growing public awareness and controversy in the early 2000s, with prominent debates about both its potential implications as well as the feasibility of the applications envisioned by advocates of molecular nanotechnology, and with governments moving to promote and fund research into nanotechnology. The early 2000s also saw the beginnings of commercial applications of nanotechnology, although these were limited to bulk applications of nanomaterials rather than the transformative applications envisioned by the field.

== Early uses of nanomaterials ==
Carbon nanotubes have been found in pottery from Keeladi, India, dating to c. 600–300 BC, though it is not known how they formed or whether the substance containing them was employed deliberately. Cementite nanowires have been observed in Damascus steel, a material dating back to c. 900 AD, their origin and means of manufacture also unknown.

Although nanoparticles are associated with modern science, they were used by artisans as far back as the ninth century in Mesopotamia for creating a glittering effect on the surface of pots.

In modern times, pottery from the Middle Ages and Renaissance often retains a distinct gold- or copper-colored metallic glitter. This luster is caused by a metallic film that was applied to the transparent surface of a glazing, which contains silver and copper nanoparticles dispersed homogeneously in the glassy matrix of the ceramic glaze. These nanoparticles are created by the artisans by adding copper and silver salts and oxides together with vinegar, ochre, and clay on the surface of previously glazed pottery. The technique originated in the Muslim world. As Muslims were not allowed to use gold in artistic representations, they sought a way to create a similar effect without using real gold. The solution they found was using luster.

== Conceptual origins ==
=== Richard Feynman ===
Richard Feynman gave a 1959 talk which many years later inspired the conceptual foundations of nanotechnology.

The American physicist Richard Feynman lectured, "There's Plenty of Room at the Bottom," at an American Physical Society meeting at Caltech on December 29, 1959, which is often held to have provided inspiration for the field of nanotechnology. Feynman had described a process by which the ability to manipulate individual atoms and molecules might be developed, using one set of precise tools to build and operate another proportionally smaller set, so on down to the needed scale. In the course of this, he noted, scaling issues would arise from the changing magnitude of various physical phenomena: gravity would become less important, surface tension and Van der Waals attraction would become more important.

After Feynman's death, a scholar studying the historical development of nanotechnology has concluded that his actual role in catalyzing nanotechnology research was limited, based on recollections from many of the people active in the nascent field in the 1980s and 1990s. Chris Toumey, a cultural anthropologist at the University of South Carolina, found that the published versions of Feynman's talk had a negligible influence in the twenty years after it was first published, as measured by citations in the scientific literature, and not much more influence in the decade after the scanning tunneling microscope was invented in 1981. Subsequently, interest in “Plenty of Room” in the scientific literature greatly increased in the early 1990s. This is probably because the term “nanotechnology” gained serious attention just before that time, following its use by K. Eric Drexler in his 1986 book, Engines of Creation: The Coming Era of Nanotechnology, which took the Feynman concept of a billion tiny factories and added the idea that they could make more copies of themselves via computer control instead of control by a human operator; and in a cover article headlined "Nanotechnology", published later that year in a mass-circulation science-oriented magazine, Omni. Toumey's analysis also includes comments from distinguished scientists in nanotechnology who say that “Plenty of Room” did not influence their early work, and in fact most of them had not read it until a later date.

Chris Tourney suggested that renewed interest in Feynman's “Plenty of Room” lecture contributed to a historical narrative that traces nanotechnology's origins to December 1959. He also suggested that associating nanotechnology with Feynman, a Nobel laureate, could enhance the appeal of research in the field.

=== Norio Taniguchi ===
Japanese scientist Norio Taniguchi of Tokyo University of Science was the first to use the term "nano-technology" in a 1974 conference, to describe semiconductor processes such as thin film deposition and ion beam milling exhibiting characteristic control on the order of a nanometer. His definition was, "'Nano-technology' mainly consists of the processing of, separation, consolidation, and deformation of materials by one atom or one molecule." However, the term was not used again until 1981 when Eric Drexler, who was unaware of Taniguchi's prior use of the term, published his first paper on nanotechnology in 1981.

=== K. Eric Drexler ===
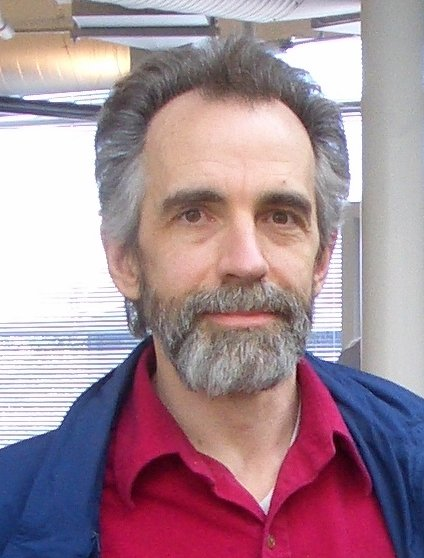
K. Eric Drexler developed and popularized the concept of nanotechnology and founded the field of molecular nanotechnology.

In the 1980s the idea of nanotechnology as a deterministic, rather than stochastic, handling of individual atoms and molecules was conceptually explored in depth by K. Eric Drexler, who promoted the technological significance of nano-scale phenomena and devices through speeches and two influential books.

In 1980, Drexler encountered Feynman's provocative 1959 talk "There's Plenty of Room at the Bottom" while preparing his initial scientific paper on the subject, “Molecular Engineering: An approach to the development of general capabilities for molecular manipulation,” published in the Proceedings of the National Academy of Sciences in 1981. The term "nanotechnology" (which paralleled Taniguchi's "nano-technology") was independently applied by Drexler in his 1986 book Engines of Creation: The Coming Era of Nanotechnology, which proposed the idea of a nanoscale "assembler" which would be able to build a copy of itself and of other items of arbitrary complexity. He also first published the term "grey goo" to describe what might happen if a hypothetical self-replicating machine, capable of independent operation, were constructed and released. Drexler's vision of nanotechnology is often called "Molecular Nanotechnology" (MNT) or "molecular manufacturing."

His 1991 Ph.D. work at the MIT Media Lab was the first doctoral degree on the topic of molecular nanotechnology and (after some editing) his thesis, "Molecular Machinery and Manufacturing with Applications to Computation," was published as Nanosystems: Molecular Machinery, Manufacturing, and Computation, which received the Association of American Publishers award for Best Computer Science Book of 1992. Drexler founded the Foresight Institute in 1986 with the mission of "Preparing for nanotechnology.” Drexler is no longer a member of the Foresight Institute.

== Experimental research and advances ==
In nanoelectronics, nanoscale thickness was demonstrated in the gate oxide and thin films used in transistors as early as the 1960s, but it was not until the late 1990s that MOSFETs (metal–oxide–semiconductor field-effect transistors) with nanoscale gate length were demonstrated. Nanotechnology and nanoscience got a boost in the early 1980s with two major developments: the birth of cluster science and the invention of the scanning tunneling microscope (STM). These developments led to the discovery of fullerenes in 1985 and the structural assignment of carbon nanotubes in 1991. The development of FinFET in the 1990s also laid the foundations for modern nanoelectronic semiconductor device fabrication.

=== Invention of scanning probe microscopy ===
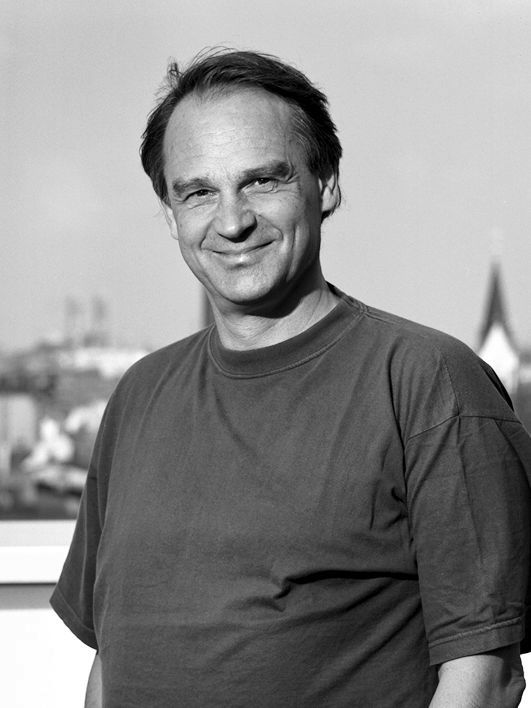
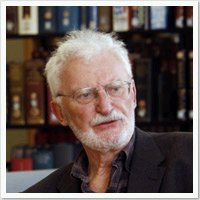
Gerd Binnig (left) and Heinrich Rohrer (right) won the 1986 Nobel Prize in Physics for their 1981 invention of the scanning tunneling microscope.

The scanning tunneling microscope, an instrument for imaging surfaces at the atomic level, was developed in 1981 by Gerd Binnig and Heinrich Rohrer at IBM Zurich Research Laboratory, for which they were awarded the Nobel Prize in Physics in 1986. Binnig, Calvin Quate and Christoph Gerber invented the first atomic force microscope in 1986. The first commercially available atomic force microscope was introduced in 1989.

IBM researcher Don Eigler was the first to manipulate atoms using a scanning tunneling microscope in 1989. He used 35 Xenon atoms to spell out the IBM logo. He shared the 2010 Kavli Prize in Nanoscience for this work.

=== Advances in interface and colloid science ===
Interface and colloid science had existed for nearly a century before they became associated with nanotechnology. The first observations and size measurements of nanoparticles had been made during the first decade of the 20th century by Richard Adolf Zsigmondy, winner of the 1925 Nobel Prize in Chemistry, who made a detailed study of gold sols and other nanomaterials with sizes down to 10 nm using an ultramicroscope which was capable of visualizing particles much smaller than the light wavelength. Zsigmondy was also the first to use the term "nanometer" explicitly for characterizing particle size. In the 1920s, Irving Langmuir, winner of the 1932 Nobel Prize in Chemistry, and Katharine B. Blodgett introduced the concept of a monolayer, a layer of material one molecule thick. In the early 1950s, Derjaguin and Abrikosova conducted the first measurement of surface forces.

In 1974 the process of atomic layer deposition for depositing uniform thin films one atomic layer at a time was developed and patented by Tuomo Suntola and co-workers in Finland.

In another development, the synthesis and properties of semiconductor nanocrystals were studied. This led to a fast increasing number of semiconductor nanoparticles of quantum dots.

=== Discovery of fullerenes ===
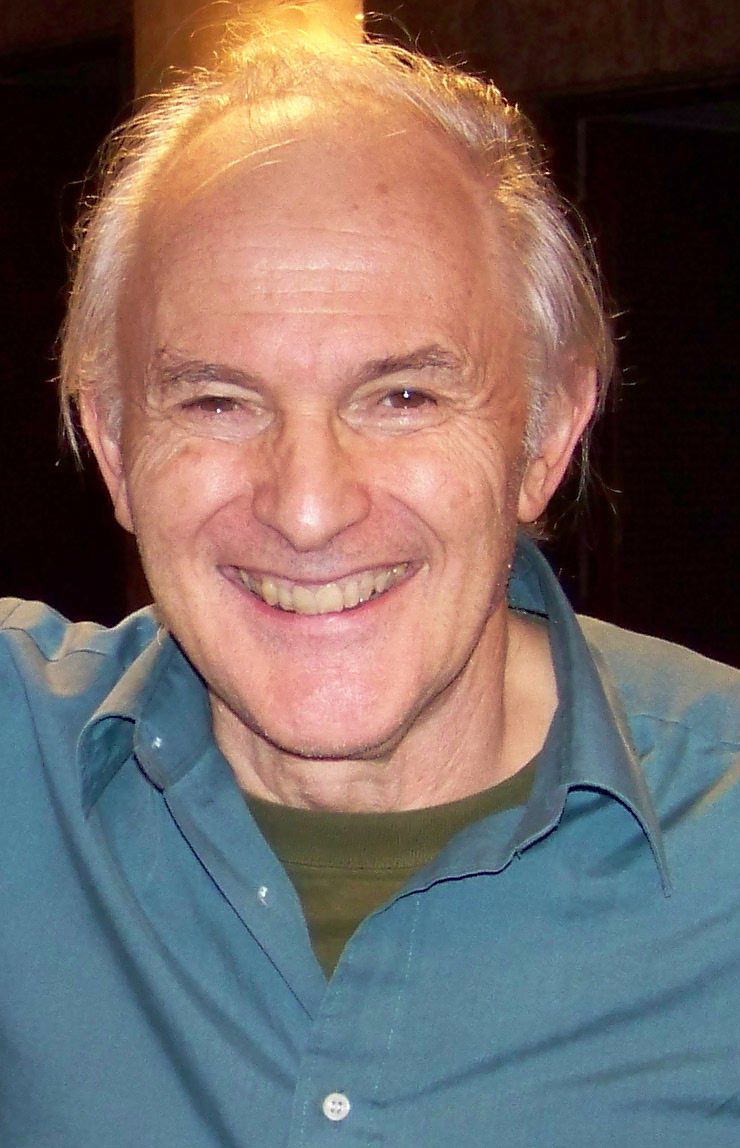
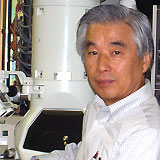
Harry Kroto (left) won the 1996 Nobel Prize in Chemistry along with Richard Smalley (pictured below) and Robert Curl for their 1985 discovery of buckminsterfullerene, while Sumio Iijima (right) won the inaugural 2008 Kavli Prize in Nanoscience for his 1991 discovery of carbon nanotubes.

Richard Smalley

Fullerenes were discovered in 1985 by Harry Kroto, Richard Smalley, and Robert Curl, who together won the 1996 Nobel Prize in Chemistry. Smalley's research in physical chemistry investigated formation of inorganic and semiconductor clusters using pulsed molecular beams and time of flight mass spectrometry. As a consequence of this expertise, Curl introduced him to Kroto in order to investigate a question about the constituents of astronomical dust. These are carbon rich grains expelled by old stars such as R Corona Borealis. The result of this collaboration was the discovery of C_{60} and the fullerenes as the third allotropic form of carbon. Subsequent discoveries included the endohedral fullerenes, and the larger family of fullerenes the following year.

The discovery of carbon nanotubes is largely attributed to Sumio Iijima of NEC in 1991, although carbon nanotubes have been produced and observed under a variety of conditions prior to 1991. Iijima's discovery of multi-walled carbon nanotubes in the insoluble material of arc-burned graphite rods in 1991 and Mintmire, Dunlap, and White's independent prediction that if single-walled carbon nanotubes could be made, then they would exhibit remarkable conducting properties helped create initial interest in carbon nanotubes. Nanotube research accelerated greatly following the independent discoveries by Bethune at IBM and Iijima at NEC of single-walled carbon nanotubes and methods to specifically produce them by adding transition-metal catalysts to the carbon in an arc discharge.

In the early 1990s, a team of researchers from the Max Planck Institute for Nuclear Physics and University of Arizona discovered how to synthesize and purify large quantities of fullerenes. This opened the door to their characterization and functionalization by hundreds of investigators in government and industrial laboratories. Shortly after, rubidium-doped C_{60} was found to be a medium-temperature superconductor. Thomas Ebbesen and Pulickel Ajayen demonstrated a method to produce carbon nanotubes at scales allowing their properties to be measured in a laboratory.

Researchers have further developed the field of nanotube-based nanotechnology. A 2024 review stated that over 5,000 tons of nanotubes were produced annually, with industrial applications including biosensors, satellite sensors, and marine coatings. Practical challenges in many applications remain, such as the difficulty of retaining their unique properties in composite materials, ensuring chemical stability, and potential for toxicity.

== Government and corporate support ==
=== National Nanotechnology Initiative ===
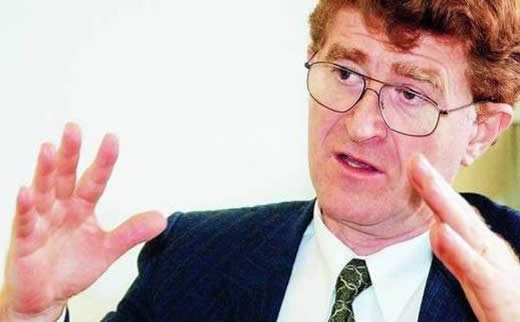
Mihail Roco of the National Science Foundation formally proposed the National Nanotechnology Initiative to the White House, and was a key architect in its initial development.

The National Nanotechnology Initiative is a United States federal nanotechnology research and development program. “The NNI serves as the central point of communication, cooperation, and collaboration for all Federal agencies engaged in nanotechnology research, bringing together the expertise needed to advance this broad and complex field." Its goals are to advance a world-class nanotechnology research and development (R&D) program, foster the transfer of new technologies into products for commercial and public benefit, develop and sustain educational resources, a skilled workforce, and the supporting infrastructure and tools to advance nanotechnology, and support responsible development of nanotechnology. The initiative was spearheaded by Mihail Roco, who formally proposed the National Nanotechnology Initiative to the Office of Science and Technology Policy during the Clinton administration in 1999, and was a key architect in its development. He is currently the Senior Advisor for Nanotechnology at the National Science Foundation, as well as the founding chair of the National Science and Technology Council subcommittee on Nanoscale Science, Engineering and Technology.

President Bill Clinton advocated nanotechnology development. In a 21 January 2000 speech at the California Institute of Technology, Clinton said, "Some of our research goals may take twenty or more years to achieve, but that is precisely why there is an important role for the federal government." Feynman's stature and concept of atomically precise fabrication played a role in securing funding for nanotechnology research, as mentioned in President Clinton's speech:

My budget supports a major new National Nanotechnology Initiative, worth $500 million. Caltech is no stranger to the idea of nanotechnology the ability to manipulate matter at the atomic and molecular level. Over 40 years ago, Caltech's own Richard Feynman asked, "What would happen if we could arrange the atoms one by one the way we want them?"

President George W. Bush further increased funding for nanotechnology. On December 3, 2003, Bush signed into law the 21st Century Nanotechnology Research and Development Act, which authorizes expenditures for five of the participating agencies totaling US$3.63 billion over four years. The NNI budget supplement for Fiscal Year 2009 provides $1.5 billion to the NNI, reflecting steady growth in the nanotechnology investment.

== Growing public awareness and controversy ==
=== "Why the future doesn't need us" ===
"Why the future doesn't need us" is an article written by Bill Joy, then Chief Scientist at Sun Microsystems, in the April 2000 issue of Wired magazine. In the article, he argues that "Our most powerful 21st-century technologies — robotics, genetic engineering, and nanotech — are threatening to make humans an endangered species." Joy argues that developing technologies provide a much greater danger to humanity than any technology before it has ever presented. In particular, he focuses on genetics, nanotechnology and robotics. He argues that 20th-century technologies of destruction, such as the nuclear bomb, were limited to large governments, due to the complexity and cost of such devices, as well as the difficulty in acquiring the required materials. He also voices concern about increasing computer power. His worry is that computers will eventually become more intelligent than we are, leading to such dystopian scenarios as robot rebellion. He notably quotes the Unabomber on this topic. After the publication of the article, Bill Joy suggested assessing technologies to gauge their implicit dangers, as well as having scientists refuse to work on technologies that have the potential to cause harm.

In the AAAS Science and Technology Policy Yearbook 2001 article titled A Response to Bill Joy and the Doom-and-Gloom Technofuturists, Bill Joy was criticized for having technological tunnel vision on his prediction, by failing to consider social factors. In Ray Kurzweil's The Singularity Is Near, he questioned the regulation of potentially dangerous technology, asking "Should we tell the millions of people afflicted with cancer and other devastating conditions that we are canceling the development of all bioengineered treatments because there is a risk that these same technologies may someday be used for malevolent purposes?".

=== Prey ===
Prey is a 2002 novel by Michael Crichton which features an artificial swarm of nanorobots which develop intelligence and threaten their human inventors. The novel generated concern within the nanotechnology community that the novel could negatively affect public perception of nanotechnology by creating fear of a similar scenario in real life.

=== Drexler–Smalley debate ===
Richard Smalley, best known for co-discovering the soccer ball-shaped “buckyball” molecule and a leading advocate of nanotechnology and its many applications, was an outspoken critic of the idea of molecular assemblers, as advocated by Eric Drexler. In 2001 he introduced scientific objections to them attacking the notion of universal assemblers in a 2001 Scientific American article, leading to a rebuttal later that year from Drexler and colleagues, and eventually to an exchange of open letters in 2003.

Smalley criticized Drexler's work on nanotechnology as naive, arguing that chemistry is extremely complicated, reactions are hard to control, and that a universal assembler is science fiction. Smalley believed that such assemblers were not physically possible and introduced scientific objections to them. His two principal technical objections, which he had termed the “fat fingers problem" and the "sticky fingers problem”, argued against the feasibility of molecular assemblers being able to precisely select and place individual atoms. He also believed that Drexler's speculations about apocalyptic dangers of molecular assemblers threaten the public support for development of nanotechnology.

Smalley first argued that "fat fingers" made MNT impossible. He later argued that nanomachines would have to resemble chemical enzymes more than Drexler's assemblers and could only work in water. He believed these would exclude the possibility of "molecular assemblers" that worked by precision picking and placing of individual atoms. Also, Smalley argued that nearly all of modern chemistry involves reactions that take place in a solvent (usually water), because the small molecules of a solvent contribute many things, such as lowering binding energies for transition states. Since nearly all known chemistry requires a solvent, Smalley felt that Drexler's proposal to use a high vacuum environment was not feasible.

Smalley also believed that Drexler's speculations about apocalyptic dangers of self-replicating machines that have been equated with "molecular assemblers" would threaten the public support for development of nanotechnology. To address the debate between Drexler and Smalley regarding molecular assemblers, Chemical & Engineering News published a point-counterpoint consisting of an exchange of letters that addressed the issues.

Drexler and coworkers responded to these two issues in a 2001 publication. Drexler and colleagues noted that Drexler never proposed universal assemblers able to make absolutely anything, but instead proposed more limited assemblers able to make a very wide variety of things. They challenged the relevance of Smalley's arguments to the more specific proposals advanced in Nanosystems. Drexler maintained that both were straw man arguments, and in the case of enzymes, Prof. Klibanov wrote in 1994, "...using an enzyme in organic solvents eliminates several obstacles..." Drexler also addresses this in Nanosystems by showing mathematically that well designed catalysts can provide the effects of a solvent and can fundamentally be made even more efficient than a solvent/enzyme reaction could ever be. Drexler had difficulty in getting Smalley to respond, but in December 2003, Chemical & Engineering News carried a 4-part debate.

Ray Kurzweil spends four pages in his book 'The Singularity Is Near' to showing that Richard Smalley's arguments are not valid, and disputing them point by point. Kurzweil ends by stating that Drexler's visions are very practicable and even happening already.

=== Royal Society report on the implications of nanotechnology ===
The Royal Society and Royal Academy of Engineering's 2004 report on the implications of nanoscience and nanotechnologies was inspired by Prince Charles' concerns about nanotechnology, including molecular manufacturing. However, the report spent almost no time on molecular manufacturing. In fact, the word "Drexler" appears only once in the body of the report (in passing), and "molecular manufacturing" or "molecular nanotechnology" not at all. The report covers various risks of nanoscale technologies, such as nanoparticle toxicology. It also provides a useful overview of several nanoscale fields. The report contains an annex (appendix) on grey goo, which cites a weaker variation of Richard Smalley's contested argument against molecular manufacturing. It concludes that there is no evidence that autonomous, self replicating nanomachines will be developed in the foreseeable future, and suggests that regulators should be more concerned with issues of nanoparticle toxicology.

== Initial commercial applications ==
The early 2000s saw the beginnings of the use of nanotechnology in commercial products, although most applications are limited to the bulk use of passive nanomaterials. Examples include titanium dioxide and zinc oxide nanoparticles in sunscreen, cosmetics and some food products; silver nanoparticles in food packaging, clothing, disinfectants and household appliances such as Silver Nano; carbon nanotubes for stain-resistant textiles; and cerium oxide as a fuel catalyst. As of March 10, 2011, the Project on Emerging Nanotechnologies estimated that over 1300 manufacturer-identified nanotech products are publicly available, with new ones hitting the market at a pace of 3–4 per week.

The National Science Foundation funded researcher David Berube to study the field of nanotechnology. His findings are published in the monograph Nano-Hype: The Truth Behind the Nanotechnology Buzz. This study concludes that much of what is sold as “nanotechnology” is in fact a recasting of straightforward materials science, which is leading to a “nanotech industry built solely on selling nanotubes, nanowires, and the like” which will “end up with a few suppliers selling low margin products in huge volumes." Further applications which require actual manipulation or arrangement of nanoscale components await further research. Though technologies branded with the term 'nano' are sometimes little related to and fall far short of the most ambitious and transformative technological goals of the sort in molecular manufacturing proposals, the term still connotes such ideas. According to Berube, there may be a danger that a "nano bubble" will form, or is forming already, from the use of the term by scientists and entrepreneurs to garner funding, regardless of interest in the transformative possibilities of more ambitious and far-sighted work.

Invention of ionizable cationic lipids at the turn of the 21st century allowed subsequent development of solid lipid nanoparticles, which in the 2020s became the most successful and well-known non-viral nanoparticle drug delivery system due to their use in several mRNA vaccines during the COVID-19 pandemic.

== See also ==
- Timeline of carbon nanotubes
- Discovery of graphene
- History of DNA nanotechnology
