= Radical Abundance (book) =

2013 book by K. Eric Drexler

- Author: K. Eric Drexler
- Subject: Nanotechnology
- Genre: Non-fiction
- Publisher: PublicAffairs
- Publication date: May 7, 2013
- Pages: 368
- ISBN: 978-1-61039-113-9
- Preceded by: Nanosystems

Radical Abundance: How a Revolution in Nanotechnology Will Change Civilization is a 2013 nonfiction book by American engineer K. Eric Drexler. The book posits that developments in nanotechnology could bring about a radical shift in human civilization through advances in manufacturing, medicine, and environmental technologies.

== Synopsis ==
Drexler explains the historical push towards atomically precise manufacturing (APM) of productive nanosystems, and how their development could affect the world. He describes APM as using nanoscale machinery to assemble larger products from molecular building blocks. He distinguishes this manufacturing goal from the broader category of nanoscale materials and devices, and argues that the meaning of "nanotechnology" shifted towards the latter.

The book contrasts scientific inquiry with engineering design. Drexler envisages desktop or garage-scale manufacturing systems that would use less fuel, land, and energy than existing factories and supply chains.

== Reception ==
Kirkus Reviews gave the book a starred review, writing that "Drexler takes readers into that landscape, explaining mechanical scaling, thermal energy, the vast difference between analog and digital, the crazy, counterintuitive world of self-assembly and the dark magic of crystal-structure prediction." Publishers Weekly also praised Drexler's writing, saying that "[he] is aware of the layperson's position of ignorance and he writes comprehensively about the problems between scientific and engineering approaches, the myths of nanotechnology that have hindered its development." Rudy M. Baum of Chemical & Engineering News gave the book a negative review, describing Drexler's ideas as impractical and full of "magical thinking".

Barbara Kiser, writing in Nature, praised Drexler's explanation of the subject while noting the substantial technical and political challenges facing APM.

== See also ==
- Engines of Creation, 1986 book by Drexler on the same topic
