= HD 19467 =

Star in the constellation Eridanus

Observation data Epoch J2000.0 Equinox ICRS
- Constellation: Eridanus
- Right ascension: 03^{h} 07^{m} 18.575^{s}
- Declination: −13° 45′ 42.42″
- Apparent magnitude (V): 6.97

Characteristics
- Evolutionary stage: main sequence
- Spectral type: G3 V + T5.5±1.0
- B−V color index: 0.645±0.010

Astrometry
Radial velocity (R_{v})	6.953±0.0003 km/s
Proper motion (μ)	RA: −8.694 mas/yr Dec.: −260.642 mas/yr
Parallax (π)	31.2191±0.024 mas
Distance	104.47 ± 0.08 ly (32.03 ± 0.02 pc)
Absolute magnitude (M_{V})	4.52

Orbit
Primary	HD 19467 A
Secondary	HD 19467 B
Period (P)	319+114 −72 yr
Semi-major axis (a)	46.9+11.0 −7.4 AU
Eccentricity (e)	0.50+0.10 −0.08
Inclination (i)	134.7+12.0 −6.9°
Longitude of the node (Ω)	134.8±4.5°
Periastron epoch (T)	2,486,750+1,523 −1,890 BJD
Argument of periastron (ω) (secondary)	280+14 −18°

Details

HD 19467 A
Mass	0.96±0.02 M_{☉}
Radius	1.20±0.03 R_{☉}
Luminosity	1.42±0.06 L_{☉}
Surface gravity (log g)	4.28±0.04 cgs
Temperature	5747±40 K
Metallicity [Fe/H]	−0.11±0.01 dex
Rotation	29.53±0.16 d
Rotational velocity (v sin i)	1.6±0.5 km/s
Age	9.4±0.9 Gyr

HD 19467 B
Mass	71.6+5.3 −4.6 M_{Jup}
Radius	0.790+0.012 −0.013 R_{Jup}
Luminosity	10^{−5.09+0.03 −0.04} L_{☉}
Surface gravity (log g)	5.45±0.06 cgs
Temperature	1,081+28 −29 K
Metallicity [Fe/H]	−0.15±0.02 dex

Other designations
- BD−14°604, FK5 1087, GJ 3200, HD 19467, HIP 14501, SAO 148780, PPM 212460

Database references
SIMBAD	data

HD 19467 is a star with an orbiting brown dwarf companion in the equatorial constellation of Eridanus. It has an apparent visual magnitude of 6.97, which is a challenge to view with the naked eye. The system is located at a distance of 104.5 light years based on parallax measurements, and is drifting further away with a radial velocity of 7 km/s. It has a high proper motion, traversing the celestial sphere at an angular rate of 0.258 arcsec yr^{−1}. Based on the motion and chemical abundances of this star it has been considered a likely member of the Wolf 630 group of co-moving stars, although its age estimate is inconsistent with that assignment.

The spectrum of HD 19467 presents as a G-type main-sequence star with a stellar classification of G3 V. It has been identified as a solar twin based on the similarity of its physical properties to the Sun. This is an older star, with age estimates range from 5.4 up to 10.1 billion years, depending on the study. It is considered a thin disk star, which should theoretically limit the age to no more than 8 billion years. The spin rate is correspondingly low with a rotation period of 29.5 days. Based on the abundance of iron, the metallicity is lower than solar. The level of magnetic activity in the star's chromosphere as well as X-ray emission are at most below the equivalent level in the Sun.

== Brown dwarf ==
In 2014, a survey team announced the discovery of a brown dwarf in orbit around HD 19467. The presence of an low-mass companion was indicated via an acceleration trend in radial velocity time series data collected between 1996 and 2021. The object was then directly imaged using the NIRC-2 instrument at the Keck Observatory. Designated HD 19467 B, it was located at an angular separation of 1.6″ from the host star. Astrometric observations taken over a 1.1 year period demonstrated that the object is clearly associated with HD 19467 A, having a similar parallax and proper motion. The radial velocity data indicated a minimum mass of 51.9+3.6
−4.3 M_{J}, with a brightness and colors matching a T-dwarf.

The spectrum of this object was taken at the Palomar Observatory, finding a spectral type of T5.5±1. It was measured as having an effective temperature of 978 K and, like the host star, a sub-solar metallicity. Orbital analysis was used to infer a mass of 65.4 M_{J}, which is near the substellar mass boundary. It has a highly eccentric orbit with period estimates ranging from 320 to 420 years, depending on the study.

== See also ==
- Scholz's Star – a star with a brown dwarf companion of similar mass to HD 19467 B
