= Tom Newman (scientist) =

Tom Newman, a graduate student at Stanford University in 1985, was one of the two people to meet one of a pair of challenges put forth by Nobel Prize-winning physicist Richard Feynman at the annual meeting of the American Physical Society in 1959, in a talk titled "There's Plenty of Room at the Bottom".

In December of that year, Feynman offered two challenges at the meeting, held that year in Caltech, offering a $1000 prize to the first person to solve each of them. Both challenges involved nanotechnology, and the first prize was won by William McLellan.

The second challenge was for anyone who could find a way to inscribe a book page on a surface area 25,000 times smaller than its standard print (a scale at which the entire contents of the Encyclopædia Britannica could fit on the head of a pin).

Newman claimed the prize when he wrote the first page of Charles Dickens' A Tale of Two Cities, at the required scale, on a 200 × 200 micron square of poly(methyl methacrylate) with a beam of electrons. The main problem he had before he could claim the prize was finding the text after he had written it; the piece of plastic was a huge empty space compared with the text inscribed on it.
