= William McLellan (American electrical engineer) =

American engineer

William Howard McLellan (December 1, 1924 – September 30, 2011) was an American electrical engineer, who achieved some fame in 1960 by succeeding at an engineering challenge set by Nobel Prize-winning physicist Richard Feynman to build the smallest ever electric motor.

== Personal life and education ==
McLellan was born in Casper, Wyoming, grew up in Orland, California, and fought in the Canadian Army in the Second World War. Serving as a radio operator in the 12th Armoured Regiment (Three Rivers Regiment), RCAC, he met his wife Patricia Price in England during the war, and afterwards the couple settled in Pasadena, California, where McLellan attended the California Institute of Technology (Caltech).

== Electric motor invention and career ==
In December 1959, Feynman offered two challenges relating to nanotechnology at the annual meeting of the American Physical Society, held that year at Caltech, offering a $1000 prize to the first person to solve each of them. The first one required someone to build a working electric motor that would fit inside a cube ^{1}/_{64} inches (0.40 mm) on each side. McLellan, at that time living nearby, achieved this feat by November 1960 and won the prize. His 250-microgram 2000-rpm motor consisted of 13 separate parts. The second challenge was for anyone who could find a way to inscribe a book page on a surface area 25,000 times smaller than its standard print (a scale at which the entire contents of the Encyclopædia Britannica could fit on the head of a pin). The prize for the second challenge was claimed only much later, by Tom Newman in 1985.

McLellan appeared on television on the I've Got a Secret program, January 4, 1961 in relation to his achievement, and spent much of his career as an engineer in Caltech's Astronomy department, remaining a consultant there for the rest of his life. He died in 2011 in Pasadena.
