= Stellar encounter =

Stars passing close to other stars

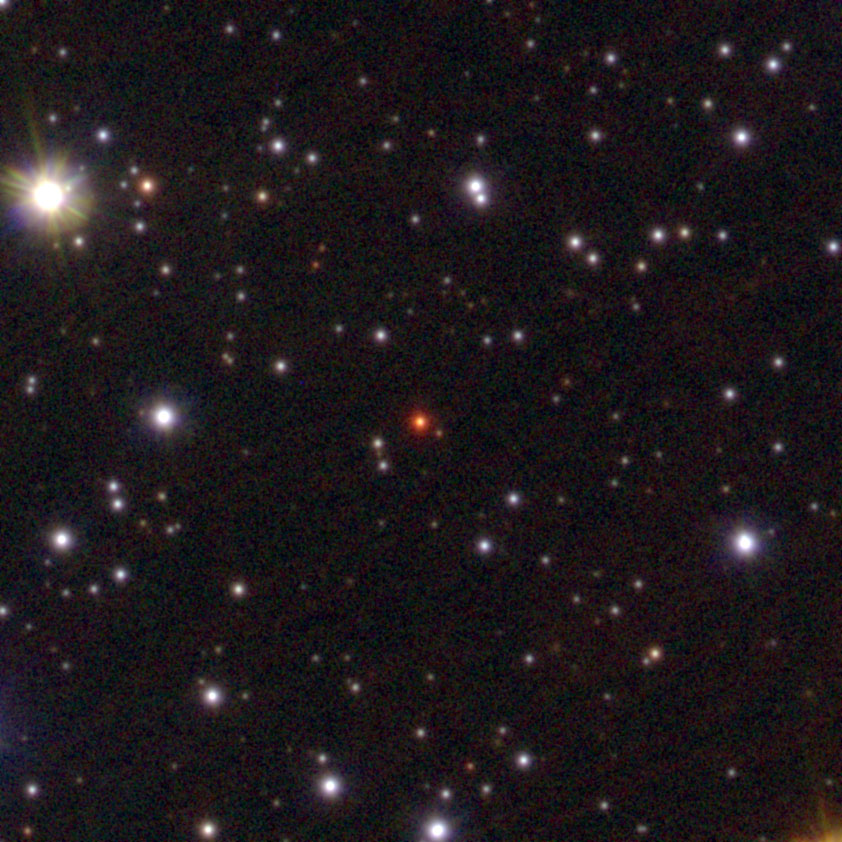
Scholz's Star (red center dot) passed within 55,000 astronomical units of Earth around 70,000 years ago.

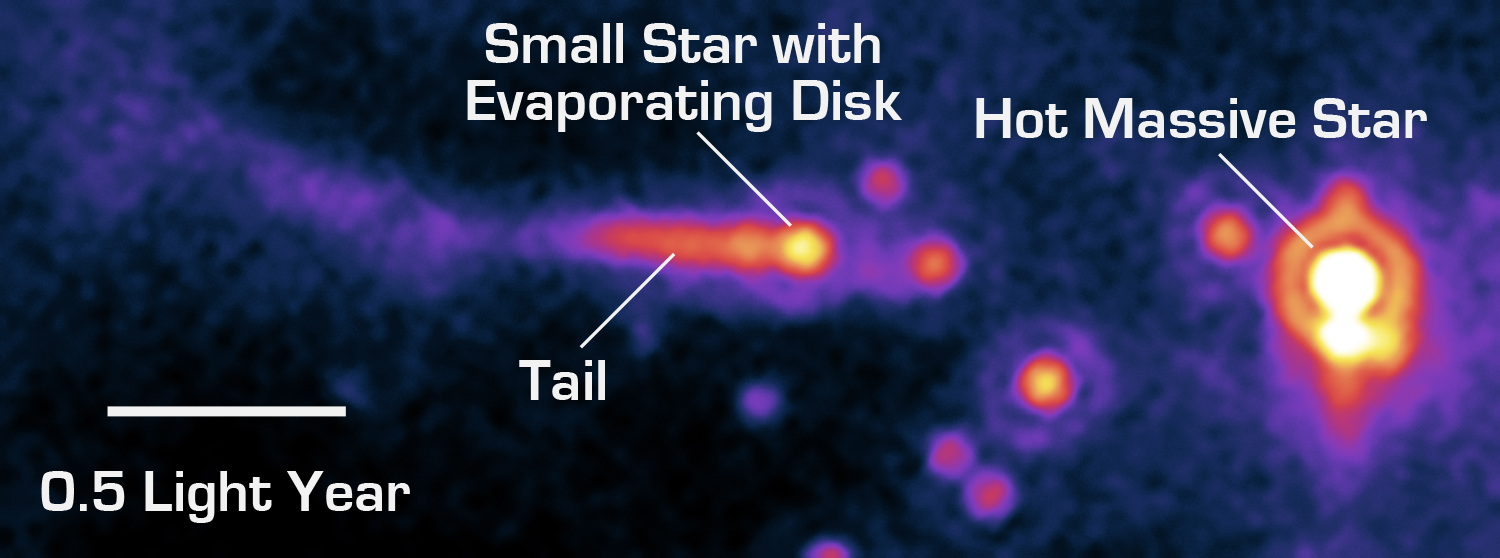
A star with a protoplanetary disk near a massive hot star. The disk is being photoevaporated due to the radiation from the large star.

A stellar encounter is an astronomical event in which two or more stars get within a close distance of each other. Encounters between stars outside dense regions are rare, but they are more frequent in regions dense with stars such as star clusters or multiple star systems. Impacts between two stars do happen but are extremely rare events. Such stellar encounters can cause both star systems to exchange materials such as cosmic dust and planets. After such encounters, especially for stars with protoplanetary disk, both systems will come out with material from the other system. Stars with protoplanetary disk in stellar rich regions undergo background heating, disk truncation and photoevaporation. These effects can halt the growth of gas giant planets during their planetary formation phase or not form any gas giant planets at all.

== Effects on the Solar System ==
Stars that pass close to the Sun within 1-2 parsecs can have major effect on the Solar System. Their gravity can perturb objects in the Oort Cloud sending comets from the outer Solar System into the inner Solar System in a “comet shower”, some of which may collide with Earth.

Stellar encounters to hot stars can expose Earth to powerful UV radiation. Nearby supernovae can be devastating to life on Earth causing the total extinction of its life and erode the ozone layer.

Especially close stellar encounters can affect the orbits of the planets. A close star can disturb the orbits of the outer giant planets (Jupiter, Saturn, Uranus and Neptune). Their altered orbits can then affect the orbit of the other giant planets and the terrestrial planets including Earth. Such orbital alterations to the orbit of Earth can have major climate effects and cause major extinction events.
