= Christine Peterson =

American nanotechnologist and co-founder of Foresight Institute

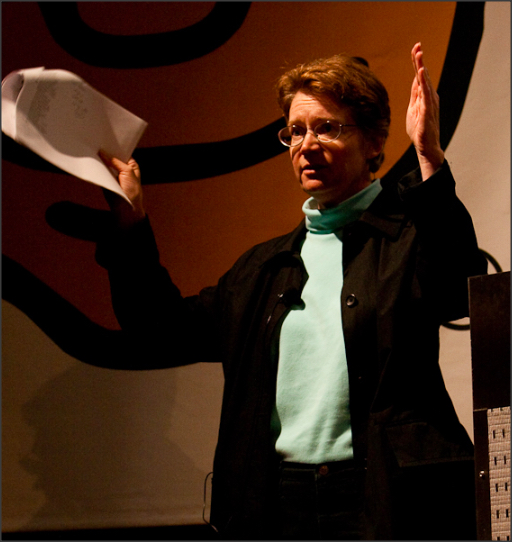
Peterson speaking at Gnomedex in 2009

Christine L. Peterson is an American forecaster and the co-founder and former president of Foresight Institute. She is credited with suggesting the term "open source" when used in connection with software. Peterson holds a bachelor's degree in chemistry from the Massachusetts Institute of Technology (MIT). She has been signed up for cryopreservation with the Alcor Life Extension Foundation since the mid-1980s.

== Career ==
Peterson co-founded Foresight Institute with Eric Drexler in 1986. Her writing and lectures address nanotechnology, artificial intelligence, and life extension. She has served on California's Blue Ribbon Task Force on Nanotechnology and the editorial advisory board of NASA's Nanotech Briefs. She also served as secretary and chapters coordinator of the L5 Society, a predecessor of the National Space Society.

== Works ==
=== Open-source software ===
Peterson suggested the term "open source" during discussions about the planned release of Netscape's browser source code. The Open Source Initiative dates the naming meeting to February 3, 1998. In a retrospective published in 2018, Peterson described the discussions, dating the meeting at VA Research to February 5:

Interest in free software was starting to grow outside the programming community, and it was increasingly clear that an opportunity was coming to change the world... [W]e discussed the need for a new term due to the confusion factor. The argument was as follows: those new to the term "free software" assume it is referring to the price. Oldtimers must then launch into an explanation, usually given as follows: "We mean free as in freedom, not free as in beer." At this point, a discussion on software has turned into one about the price of an alcoholic beverage...

Between meetings that week, I was still focused on the need for a better name and came up with the term "open source software." While not ideal, it struck me as good enough. I ran it by at least four others: Eric Drexler, Mark Miller, and Todd Anderson liked it, while a friend in marketing and public relations felt the term "open" had been overused and abused and believed we could do better. He was right in theory; however, I didn't have a better idea... Later that week, on February 5, 1998, a group was assembled at VA Research to brainstorm on strategy. Attending – in addition to Eric Raymond, Todd, and me – were Larry Augustin, Sam Ockman, and attending by phone, Jon "maddog" Hall... Todd was on the ball. Instead of making an assertion that the community should use this specific new term, he did something less directive – a smart thing to do with this community of strong-willed individuals. He simply used the term in a sentence on another topic – just dropped it into the conversation to see what happened.... A few minutes later, one of the others used the term, evidently without noticing, still discussing a topic other than terminology. Todd and I looked at each other out of the corners of our eyes to check: yes, we had both noticed what happened...

Toward the end of the meeting, the question of terminology was brought up explicitly, probably by Todd or Eric. Maddog mentioned "freely distributable" as an earlier term, and "cooperatively developed" as a newer term. Eric listed "free software," "open source," and "sourceware" as the main options. Todd advocated the "open source" model, and Eric endorsed this... Eric Raymond was far better positioned to spread the new meme, and he did. Bruce Perens signed on to the effort immediately, helping set up Opensource.org and playing a key role in spreading the new term... By late February, both O'Reilly & Associates and Netscape had started to use the term. After this, there was a period during which the term was promoted by Eric Raymond to the media, by Tim O'Reilly to business, and by both to the programming community. It seemed to spread very quickly.

— Christine Peterson, "How I coined the term 'open source'" (2018)

=== Books ===
In 1991 she coauthored Unbounding the Future: the Nanotechnology Revolution with Gayle Pergamit and Eric Drexler, which sketches nanotechnology's potential environmental and medical benefits as well as possible abuses. In 1997 she coauthored Leaping the Abyss: Putting Group Genius to Work with Gayle Pergamit.

=== Book chapters ===
- "Thinking Longer Term about Technology", 2008.
