= Foresight Institute =

American nonprofit research organization

The Foresight Institute
- Formation: 1986
- Founder: Eric Drexler and Christine Peterson
- Type: 501(c)(3) nonprofit research organization
- Headquarters: 50 California Street, Suite 1500, San Francisco, California, United States
- Fields: Artificial intelligence for science and safety, nanotechnology, biotechnology and longevity, neurotechnology, space, existential hope
- CEO: Allison Duettmann
- Website: foresight.org
- Formerly called: Foresight Nanotech Institute (2005–2009)

The Foresight Institute (Foresight) is an American research nonprofit organization that promotes the development of nanotechnology and other emerging technologies, such as safe AGI, biotech and longevity.

Foresight runs four cross-disciplinary program tracks to research, advance, and govern maturing technologies for the long-term benefit of life and the biosphere: Molecular machines nanotechnology for building better materials, biotechnology for health extension, and computer science and crypto commerce for intelligent global cooperation.

== History ==
The Foresight Institute was founded in 1986 by Christine Peterson, K. Eric Drexler, and James C. Bennett to support the development of nanotechnology. Many of the institute's initial members came to it from the L5 Society, who were hoping to form a smaller group more focused on nanotechnology. In 1991, the Foresight Institute created two suborganizations with funding from tech entrepreneur Mitch Kapor; the Institute for Molecular Manufacturing and the Center for Constitutional Issues in Technology. In the 1990s, the Foresight Institute launched several initiatives to provide funding to developers of nanotechnology. In 1993, it created the Feynman Prize in Nanotechnology, named after physicist Richard Feynman. In May 2005, the Foresight Institute changed its name to "Foresight Nanotech Institute", though it reverted to its original name in June 2009.

In 2020, following the COVID-19 pandemic, the institute moved its programs online.

== Organization ==
Foresight also runs a program on "existential hope", pushing forward the concept coined by Toby Ord and Owen Cotton-Barratt in their 2015 paper "Existential risk and Existential hope: Definitions", in which they wrote

we want to be able to refer to the chance of an existential eucatastrophe; upside risk on a large scale. We could call such a chance an existential hope. ... Some people are trying to identify and avert specific threats to our future – reducing existential risk. Others are trying to steer us towards a world where we are robustly well-prepared to face whatever obstacles come – they are seeking to increase existential hope.

Foresight's stated strategy is to focus on creating a community that promotes beneficial uses of new technologies and reduce misuse and accidents potentially associated with them.

Foresight runs a one-year Fellowship program aimed at giving researchers and innovators the support and mentorship to accelerate their projects while they continue to work in their existing career.

Since 2021, Foresight has hosted a podcast about grand futures called "The Foresight Institute Podcast" and shares all their material as open source via YouTube with lectures from scientists and other relevant actors within their fields of interest.

In addition, Foresight hosts Vision Weekend, an annual conferences focused on envisioning positive, long-term futures enabled by science and technology. The institute holds conferences on molecular nanotechnology and awards yearly prizes for developments in the field.

== Debate over molecular manufacturing ==
The feasibility of molecular manufacturing, the technology the institute was founded to explore, has been debated by scientists. In a 2003 exchange of letters in Chemical & Engineering News, the chemist and Nobel laureate Richard Smalley argued that molecular assemblers of the kind Drexler proposed were not physically achievable; Drexler defended his position in a series of published replies. The exchange took place as United States federal funding for nanotechnology, channeled through the National Nanotechnology Initiative established in 2000, went largely to materials science and nanoscale devices rather than to the molecular manufacturing the institute had been founded to pursue. Writing in Wired in 2004, Ed Regis described Drexler as having been pushed to the margins of the field he had helped establish.

Criticism has also come from within nanoscience. The Stanford biophysicist Steven Block has characterized Drexler and the futurists around the Foresight Institute as unduly influenced by science fiction, arguing that the field should distance itself from what he termed the "giggle factor" if it is to be taken seriously.

== Prizes ==
The Feynman Prize in Nanotechnology is an award given by the Foresight Institute for significant advances in nanotechnology. Between 1993 and 1997, one prize was given biennially. Since 1997, two prizes have been given each year, divided into the categories of theory and experimentation. The prize is named in honor of physicist Richard Feynman, whose 1959 talk "There's Plenty of Room at the Bottom" is considered to have inspired and informed the start of the field of nanotechnology. Author Colin Milburn refers to the prize as an example of "fetishizing" its namesake Feynman, due to his "prestige as a scientist and his fame among the broader public."

The Foresight Institute also offers the Feynman Grand Prize, a $250,000 award to the first persons to create both a nanoscale robotic arm capable of precise positional control and a nanoscale 8-bit adder, with both conditions conforming to given specifications. The Feynman Grand Prize is intended to emulate historical prizes such as the Longitude prize, Orteig Prize, Kremer prize, Ansari X Prize, and two prizes that were offered by Richard Feynman personally as challenges during his 1959 "There's Plenty of Room at the Bottom" talk. In 2004, X-Prize Foundation founder Peter Diamandis was selected to chair the Feynman Grand Prize committee.

== See also ==
- Nanomedicine
- Transhumanism
