= Scholz's Star =

Binary stellar systems in the constellation Monoceros

- Location of Scholz's Star in the constellation Monoceros

Observation data Epoch J2000.0 Equinox J2000.0
- Constellation: Monoceros
- Right ascension: 07^{h} 20^{m} 03.254^{s}
- Declination: −08° 46′ 49.90″
- Apparent magnitude (V): 18.3

Characteristics

Scholz's Star A
- Spectral type: M9.5±0.5

Scholz's Star B
- Spectral type: T5.5±0.5

Astrometry
Radial velocity (R_{v})	82.4±0.3 km/s
Proper motion (μ)	RA: −40.3±0.2 mas/yr Dec.: −114.8±0.4 mas/yr
Parallax (π)	147.1±1.2 mas
Distance	22.2 ± 0.2 ly (6.80 ± 0.06 pc)
Absolute magnitude (M_{V})	19.4

Orbit
Period (P)	8.06+0.24 −0.25 yr
Semi-major axis (a)	0.320±0.003" (2.173+0.028 −0.029 AU)
Eccentricity (e)	0.240+0.009 −0.010
Inclination (i)	106.9±0.4°
Longitude of the node (Ω)	240.21±0.28°
Periastron epoch (T)	2015/09/16+23 −28
Argument of periastron (ω) (secondary)	1±5°

Details

Scholz's Star A
Mass	99±6 M_{Jup}
Radius	0.992+0.006 −0.007 R_{Jup}
Luminosity	10^{−3.505+0.016 −0.017} L_{☉}
Surface gravity (log g)	5.3363+0.0036 −0.0029 cgs
Temperature	2,407+14 −15 K
Age	5.5+2.9 −3.2 Gyr

Scholz's Star B
Mass	66±4 M_{Jup}
Radius	0.822+0.016 −0.015 R_{Jup}
Luminosity	10^{−4.81±0.07} L_{☉}
Surface gravity (log g)	5.387+0.033 −0.023 cgs
Temperature	1,250±40 K
Age	6.8+2.2 −3.1 Gyr

Other designations
- Scholz's Star, WISE J072003.20−084651.2, WISE 0720−0846, 2MASS J07200325−0846499, 2MASS 0720−0846

Database references
SIMBAD	data

Scholz's Star /ˈʃoʊlz(əz)/ (WISE designation WISE 0720−0846 or fully WISE J072003.20−084651.2) is a dim binary stellar system 22 light-years (6.8 parsecs) from the Sun in the constellation Monoceros near the galactic plane. It was discovered in 2013 by astronomer Ralf-Dieter Scholz. In 2015, Eric Mamajek and collaborators reported that the system passed through the Solar System's Oort cloud roughly 70,000 years ago in a stellar encounter, and dubbed it Scholz's Star.

== Characteristics ==
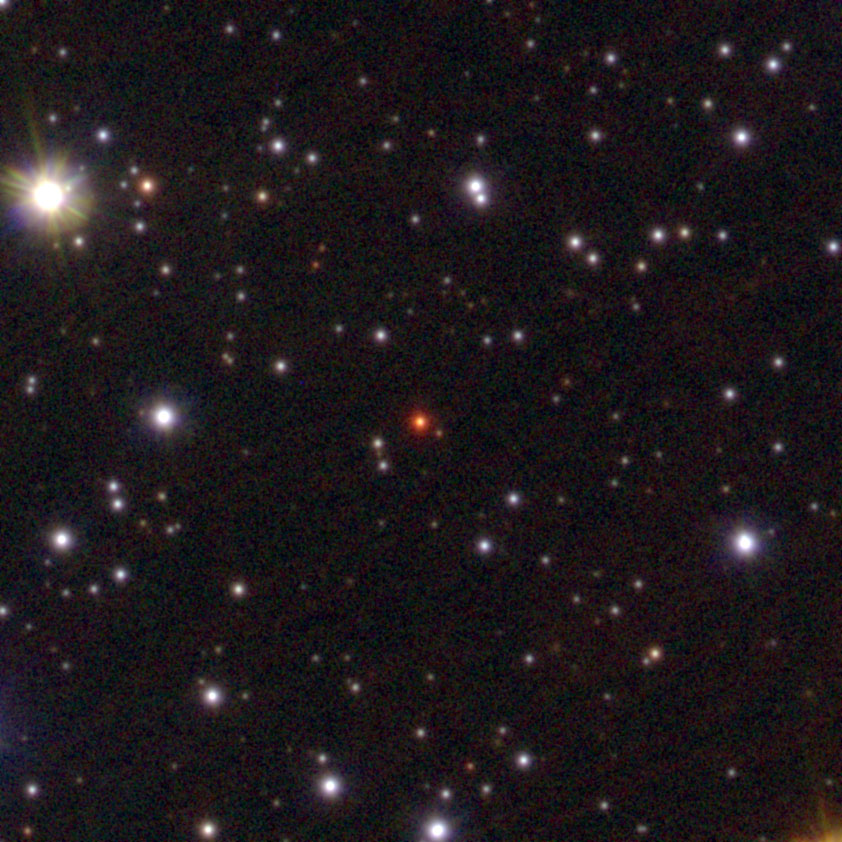
Scholz's Star with ESO's VPHAS+

The primary is a red dwarf with a stellar classification of M9±1 and 86±2 Jupiter masses. The secondary is probably a T5 brown dwarf with 65±12 Jupiter masses. The system has 0.15 solar masses. The pair orbit at a distance of about 0.8 astronomical units (120 million kilometres; 74 million miles) with a period of roughly 4 years. The system has an apparent magnitude of 18.3, and is estimated to be between 3 and 10 billion years old. With a parallax of 166 mas (0.166 arcseconds), about 80 star systems are closer to the Sun. It is a late discovery, as far as nearby stars go, because of its dim magnitude and that past efforts concentrated on high-proper-motion objects.

== Solar System flyby ==
Estimates indicate that the WISE 0720−0846 system passed about 52,000 astronomical units (0.25 parsecs; 0.82 light-years) from the Sun about 70,000 years ago. Ninety-eight percent of mathematical simulations of the star system's trajectory indicated that it passed through the Solar System's Oort cloud, or within 120,000 AU (0.58 pc; 1.9 ly) of the Sun. Comets perturbed from the Oort cloud would require roughly two million years to get to the inner Solar System. Even at closest approach the system would have only had an apparent magnitude of about 11.4, too dim for the unaided eye, but with instruments would have been best viewed from high latitudes in the northern hemisphere.

In 2018, research was published indicating that disturbance of the Oort cloud will have a greater effect than initial research had indicated.

In a recent estimate, WISE J0720−0846AB passed within 68.7 ± 2.0 kAU of the Sun 80.5 ± 0.7 kyr ago. A later recalculation of the impact parameters using updated Solar System data showed that the perihelion distance during the encounter had a median value of 0.330 pc with a 90% probability of having come within 0.317–0.345 pc of the Sun; the associated time of perihelion passage was determined to be between 78.6–81.1 kyr ago with 90% confidence, with a most likely value of 79.9 kyr.

A star is expected to pass through the Oort cloud every 100,000 years or so. An approach as close or closer than 52,000 AU is expected to occur about every 9 million years. In about 1.4 million years, Gliese 710 will come to a perihelion of between 8,800 and 13,700 AU.

== Naming ==
The star was first discovered to be a nearby one by astronomer Ralf-Dieter Scholz, announced on arXiv in November 2013. Given the importance of the system having passed so close to the Solar System in prehistorical times, Eric Mamajek and collaborators dubbed the system Scholz's star in their paper discussing the star's velocity and past trajectory.

== See also ==
- List of nearest stars and brown dwarfs#Distant future and past encounters
- HIP 85605
- Stars named after people
