= HIP 85605 =

Star of uncertain spectral type in the constellation Hercules

Observation data Epoch J2000 Equinox J2000
- Constellation: Hercules
- Right ascension: 17^{h} 29^{m} 36.278^{s}
- Declination: +24° 39′ 11.01″
- Apparent magnitude (V): 11.03

Characteristics
- Evolutionary stage: red giant branch
- Spectral type: K4V
- B−V color index: 1.14
- J−H color index: 0.526
- J−K color index: 0.646

Astrometry
Radial velocity (R_{v})	−21.30±0.16 km/s
Proper motion (μ)	RA: +4.837±0.008 mas/yr Dec.: −8.718±0.011 mas/yr
Parallax (π)	1.8860±0.0111 mas
Distance	1,730 ± 10 ly (530 ± 3 pc)

Details
Mass	1.2 M_{☉}
Radius	5.7 R_{☉}
Luminosity	15.8±0.5 L_{☉}
Surface gravity (log g)	2.97 cgs
Temperature	4,812±96 K

Other designations
- 2MASS J17293627+2439111, TYC 2079-1800-1, WDS J17296+2439B

Database references
SIMBAD	data

HIP 85605 is a star in the constellation Hercules with a visual apparent magnitude of 11.03. It was once thought to be a M dwarf or K-type main-sequence star and a possible companion of the brighter star HIP 85607, but they are now known to be an optical double. Both objects are red giants separated by a greater distance than the original measurements indicated: HIP 85605 is 1,730±10 light years away while HIP 85607 is 1,323±13 light years away.

== Distance estimation ==
The original Hipparcos parallax measurement in 1997 was 202 mas, which would have placed it 16.1 light-years from the Solar System. In 2007, van Leeuwen revised the number to 147 mas (0.147 arcseconds), or 22.2 light-years. With this new value, HIP 85605 would have been unlikely to be one of the 100 closest star systems to the Sun. In 2014, it was estimated that HIP 85605 could approach to about 0.13 to 0.65 light-years (0.04 to 0.2 pc) from the Sun within 240,000 to 470,000 years, assuming the then-known parallax and distance measurements to the object were correct. In that case its gravitational influence could have disrupted the orbits of comets in the Oort cloud and caused some of them to enter the inner Solar System.

With the release of Gaia DR2, it was determined that HIP 85605 is actually a much more distant 1,790±30 light-years away and will not be passing remotely close to the Sun at any point in time.

== See also ==
- Stars that actually passed/will pass close to the Sun:
  - Scholz's Star
  - Gliese 710
- List of nearest stars and brown dwarfs
