= Nanosystems (book) =

1992 non-fiction book by K. Eric Drexler

- Author: K. Eric Drexler
- Subject: Nanotechnology
- Genre: Non-fiction
- Publisher: J. Wiley & Sons
- Publication date: 1992
- Pages: 576
- ISBN: 978-0-471-57518-4 (paperback)

Nanosystems: Molecular Machinery, Manufacturing, and Computation is a 1992 non-fiction book by American engineer K. Eric Drexler.

It is a technical introduction to molecular nanotechnology. The book expanded on ideas previously explored in Engines of Creation (1986), providing a scientific framework for how such technology would function.

The book began as notes for a course Drexler taught at Stanford University in 1988; early versions of some chapters formed his 1991 doctoral thesis at MIT.

== Contents ==
The book is divided into three parts. The first examines the physical basis of molecular machinery, including molecular dynamics, positional uncertainty and energy dissipation. The second describes proposed components and systems, including bearings, gears, computers and manufacturing equipment. The third considers strategies for developing molecular manufacturing from chemical and biochemical techniques.

== Reception ==
In a 1993 review for Nature, Philip Ball argued that chemical methods might achieve some of Drexler's aims more directly. In a 2021 retrospective, Ball described both Nanosystems and Engines of Creation as influential on futurologists, including Ray Kurzweil.

The book received the Association of American Publishers award for Best Computer Science Book of 1992.
