= Engines of Creation =

1986 book written by K. Eric Drexler

Engines of Creation: The Coming Era of Nanotechnology
- Hardcover of updated version
- Author: K. Eric Drexler
- Language: English
- Subject: Molecular nanotechnology
- Genre: Non-fiction
- Publisher: Anchor Press/Doubleday
- Publication date: 1986
- Publication place: United States
- Media type: Print
- Pages: 298
- ISBN: 0-385-19973-2
- OCLC: 22745218
- Followed by: Nanosystems

Engines of Creation: The Coming Era of Nanotechnology is a 1986 molecular nanotechnology book written by K. Eric Drexler with a foreword by Marvin Minsky. An updated version was released in 2007. The book has been translated into Japanese, French, Spanish, Italian, Russian, and Chinese.

== Synopsis ==
The book features nanotechnology, which Richard Feynman had discussed in his 1959 speech "There's Plenty of Room at the Bottom." Drexler imagines a world where universal assemblers, tiny machines that can build objects atom by atom, will be used for everything from medicinal robots that help clear capillaries to environmental scrubbers that clear pollutants from the air. In the book, Drexler discusses the gray goo scenario—a hypothetical outcome if molecular nanotechnology were used to build uncontrolled self-replicating machines. Topics also include hypertext as developed by Project Xanadu, artificial intelligence, cryonics, and life extension. Drexler takes a Malthusian view of exponential growth within limits to growth. He also promotes space advocacy, arguing that life can expand beyond Earth’s resource limits, but that even space cannot sustain unlimited exponential growth. Drexler discusses the Fermi paradox, arguing that as there is no evidence of alien civilizations, "Thus for now, and perhaps forever, we can make plans for our future without concern for limits imposed by other civilizations."

== Nanosystems (1992) ==
Drexler's 1992 book, Nanosystems: molecular machinery, manufacturing, and computation is a technical treatment of similar material. Nanosystems addresses chemical, thermodynamic, and other constraints on nanotechnology and manufacturing.

== Engines of Creation 2.0 (2007) ==
An updated version of the book, Engines of Creation 2.0, which includes more recent papers and publications, was published as a free ebook by WOWIO in February 2007. Its additions include an author’s retrospective, Feynman’s 1959 lecture, advice to aspiring nanotechnologists, two technical papers, and the Drexler–Smalley debate with commentary by Ray Kurzweil. In the new author’s letter, Drexler argues that self-replicating assemblers are unnecessarily complex and inefficient, favoring desktop-scale manufacturing systems.

== Reception ==
Reviewing the book in 1986, Terence Monmaney contrasted Drexler’s confidence in nanotechnology with earlier failed technological predictions, such as nuclear power being too cheap to meter. Scientists such as Nobel Laureate Richard Smalley and chemist George M. Whitesides have been particularly critical. Smalley has engaged in open debate with Drexler, attacking the views presented for what he considered both the dubious nature of the science behind them, and the misleading effect on the public's view of nanotechnology. In a 1999 article in Time, Michael Krantz wrote that "Drexler’s idea was initially dismissed as science fiction, but even skeptics admit that, unlike time travel and warp drives, nothing about it actually violates the laws of physics." Krantz suggested that "Great leaps forward come from thinking outside the box. Drexler may be remembered as the man who saw how to build a whole new box." The work has been credited with helping to popularize the concept of nanotechnology.

== See also ==
- The Limits to Growth, 1972 report
- Radical Abundance, 2013 book by Drexler
- Planetary boundaries
