= There's Plenty of Room at the Bottom =

1959 lecture by Richard Feynman

Miniaturization (publ. 1961) included Feynman's lecture as its final chapter.

"There's Plenty of Room at the Bottom: An Invitation to Enter a New Field of Physics" was a lecture given by physicist Richard Feynman at the annual American Physical Society meeting at Caltech on December 29, 1959. Feynman considered the possibility of direct manipulation of individual atoms as a form of synthetic chemistry. Versions of the talk were reprinted in a few popular magazines, but it went largely unnoticed until the 1980s.

== Conception ==
Feynman considered some ramifications of a general ability to manipulate matter on an atomic scale. He distinguished shrinking printed text from encoding information in three dimensions, estimating that the contents of the world's books could fit in a cube 1/200 inch (about 0.13 mm) wide. He also noted that devices at the atomic scale would be governed by quantum mechanics, opening possibilities based on discrete energy levels and spins. He was particularly interested in the possibilities of denser computer circuitry and microscopes that could see things much smaller than was possible with the electron microscopes of his time. These ideas were later realized by the use of the scanning tunneling microscope, the atomic force microscope and other examples of scanning probe microscopy and storage systems such as Millipede.

Feynman also suggested that it should be possible, in principle, to make nanoscale machines that "arrange the atoms the way we want" and do chemical synthesis by mechanical manipulation.

He also presented the possibility of "swallowing the doctor", an idea that he credited in the essay to his friend and graduate student Albert Hibbs. This concept involved building a tiny, swallowable surgical robot.

As a thought experiment, he proposed developing a set of one-quarter-scale manipulator hands controlled by the hands of a human operator, to build one-quarter scale machine tools analogous to those found in any machine shop. This set of small tools would then be used by the small hands to build and operate ten sets of one-sixteenth-scale hands and tools, and so forth, culminating in perhaps a billion tiny factories to achieve massively parallel operations. He uses the analogy of a pantograph as a way of scaling down items. This idea was anticipated in part, down to the microscale, by science fiction author Robert A. Heinlein in his 1942 story Waldo.

A ribosome functions as a biological machine. Feynman cited biological systems as examples of small structures that manufacture substances and store information.

As the sizes got smaller, one would have to redesign tools because the relative strength of various forces would change. Gravity would become less important, and Van der Waals forces would become more important. Feynman mentioned these scaling issues during his talk. Some types of biological enzymes and enzyme complexes (especially ribosomes) function chemically in a way close to Feynman's vision. Feynman also mentioned in his lecture that it might be better eventually to use glass or plastic because their greater uniformity would avoid problems in the very small scale (metals and crystals are separated into domains where the lattice structure prevails). At present, there are electronic components made of both materials. In glass, there are optical fiber cables that carry and amplify light. In plastic, field effect transistors are being made with polymers, such as polythiophene that becomes an electrical conductor when oxidized.

== Challenges ==
At the meeting Feynman concluded his talk with two challenges, and offered a prize of $1000 for the first to solve each one. The first challenge involved the construction of a tiny motor, which, to Feynman's surprise, was achieved by November 1960 by Caltech graduate William McLellan, a meticulous craftsman, using conventional tools. The motor met the conditions, but did not advance the field. The motor had to fit within a cube 1/64 inch (about 0.4 mm) on each side, excluding its lead-in wires. The second challenge involved the possibility of scaling down letters small enough so as to be able to fit the entire Encyclopædia Britannica on the head of a pin, by writing the information from a book page on a surface 1/25,000 smaller in linear scale. In 1985, Tom Newman, a Stanford graduate student, successfully reduced the first paragraph of A Tale of Two Cities by 1/25,000, and collected the second Feynman prize. Newman's thesis adviser, R. Fabian Pease, had read the paper in 1966, but it was another graduate student in the lab, Ken Polasko, who had recently read it who suggested attempting the challenge. Newman was looking for an arbitrary random pattern to demonstrate their technology. Newman said, "Text was ideal because it has so many different shapes."

== Reception ==
The New Scientist reported "the scientific audience was captivated." Feynman had "spun the idea off the top of his mind" without even "notes from beforehand". There were no copies of the speech available. A "foresighted admirer" brought a tape recorder and an edited transcript, without Feynman's jokes, was made for publication by Caltech. In February 1960, Caltech's Engineering and Science published the speech. In addition to excerpts in The New Scientist, versions were printed in The Saturday Review and Popular Science. Newspapers announced the winning of the first challenge. The lecture was included as the final chapter in the 1961 book, Miniaturization.

== Impact ==
K. Eric Drexler later took the Feynman concept of a billion tiny factories and added the idea that they could make more copies of themselves, via computer control instead of control by a human operator, in his 1986 book Engines of Creation: The Coming Era of Nanotechnology.

After Feynman's death, scholars studying the historical development of nanotechnology have concluded that his role in catalyzing nanotechnology research was not highly rated by many people active in the nascent field in the 1980s and 1990s. Chris Toumey, a cultural anthropologist at the University of South Carolina, has reconstructed the history of the publication and republication of Feynman's talk, along with the record of citations to "Plenty of Room" in the scientific literature.

In Toumey's 2008 article "Reading Feynman into Nanotechnology", he found 11 versions of the publication of "Plenty of Room", plus two instances of a closely related talk by Feynman, "Infinitesimal Machinery", which Feynman called "Plenty of Room, Revisited" (published under the name "Infinitesimal Machinery"). Also in Toumey's references are videotapes of that second talk. The journal Nature Nanotechnology dedicated an issue in 2009 to the subject.

Toumey found that the published versions of Feynman's talk had a negligible influence in the twenty years after it was first published, as measured by citations in the scientific literature, and not much more influence in the decade after the scanning tunneling microscope was invented in 1981. Interest in "Plenty of Room" in the scientific literature greatly increased in the early 1990s. This is probably because the term "nanotechnology" gained serious attention just before that time, following its use by Drexler in his 1986 book, Engines of Creation: The Coming Era of Nanotechnology, which cited Feynman, and in a cover article headlined "Nanotechnology", published later that year in a mass-circulation science-oriented magazine, OMNI. The journal Nanotechnology was launched in 1990; the famous Eigler-Schweizer experiment, precisely manipulating 35 xenon atoms, was published in Nature in April 1990; and Science had a special issue on nanotechnology in November 1991. These and other developments hint that the retroactive rediscovery of "Plenty of Room" gave nanotechnology a packaged history that provided an early date of December 1959, plus a connection to Richard Feynman.

Toumey's analysis also includes comments from scientists in nanotechnology who say that "Plenty of Room" did not influence their early work, and most of them had not read it until a later date.

Feynman's stature as a Nobel laureate and an important figure in 20th-century science helped advocates of nanotechnology. It provided a valuable intellectual link to the past. More concretely, his stature and concept of atomically precise fabrication played a role in securing funding for nanotechnology research, illustrated by President Clinton's January 2000 speech calling for a federal program:

My budget supports a major new National Nanotechnology Initiative, worth $500 million. Caltech is no stranger to the idea of nanotechnology, the ability to manipulate matter at the atomic and molecular level. Over 40 years ago, Caltech's own Richard Feynman asked, "What would happen if we could arrange the atoms one by one the way we want them?"

The version of the Nanotechnology Research and Development Act that the House passed in May 2003 called for a study of the technical feasibility of molecular manufacturing, but this study was removed to safeguard funding of less controversial research before it was passed by the Senate and signed into law by President George W. Bush on December 3, 2003.

In 2016, a group of researchers of TU Delft and INL reported the storage of a paragraph of Feynman's talk using binary code where every bit was made with a single atomic vacancy. Using a scanning tunnelling microscope to manipulate thousands of atoms, the researchers crafted the text:

But I am not afraid to consider the final question as to whether, ultimately – in the great future – we can arrange the atoms the way we want; the very atoms, all the way down! What would happen if we could arrange the atoms one by one the way we want them (within reason, of course; you can't put them so that they are chemically unstable, for example). Up to now, we have been content to dig in the ground to find minerals. We heat them and we do things on a large scale with them, and we hope to get a pure substance with just so much impurity, and so on. But we must always accept some atomic arrangement that nature gives us. We haven't got anything, say, with a "checkerboard" arrangement, with the impurity atoms precisely arranged 1,000 angstroms apart, or in some other particular pattern.

The memory held 1,016 bytes (8,128 bits), each encoded by the orientation of a chlorine atom–vacancy pair, with a storage density of 502 terabits per square inch. The memory was assembled on a copper surface using a layer of chlorine atoms. This self-referential tribute to Feynman's vision was covered both by scientific journals and mainstream media.

== Editions ==
- Feynman, Richard P. (April 2, 1960). "The Wonders That Await a Micro-Microscope". The Saturday Review. pp. 45–47.
- Feynman, Richard P. (November 1960). "How to Build an Automobile Smaller Than This Dot". Popular Science. New York, New York: Popular Science Publishing Co., Inc. pp. 114–116, 230–232. Archived from the original on 2022-03-04. A condensed version of the talk.
- Feynman, Richard P. (1961). "There's Plenty of Room at the Bottom". In Gilbert, Horace D. (ed.). Miniaturization. Reinhold. pp. 282–296. Archived from the original on 2022-03-04.
- Feynman, R.P. (1 March 1992). "There's plenty of room at the bottom (data storage)". Journal of Microelectromechanical Systems. 1 (1): 60–66. Bibcode:1992JMemS...1...60F. doi:10.1109/84.128057. S2CID 40094454. A reprint of the talk.
- Feynman, R. (1993). "Infinitesimal machinery". Journal of Microelectromechanical Systems. 2 (1): 4–14. Bibcode:1993JMemS...2....4F. doi:10.1109/84.232589. S2CID 138577784. A sequel to his first talk.

== See also ==
- Foresight Nanotech Institute Feynman Prize
- Moore's law
- Nanocar
