= K. Eric Drexler =

American engineer (born 1955)

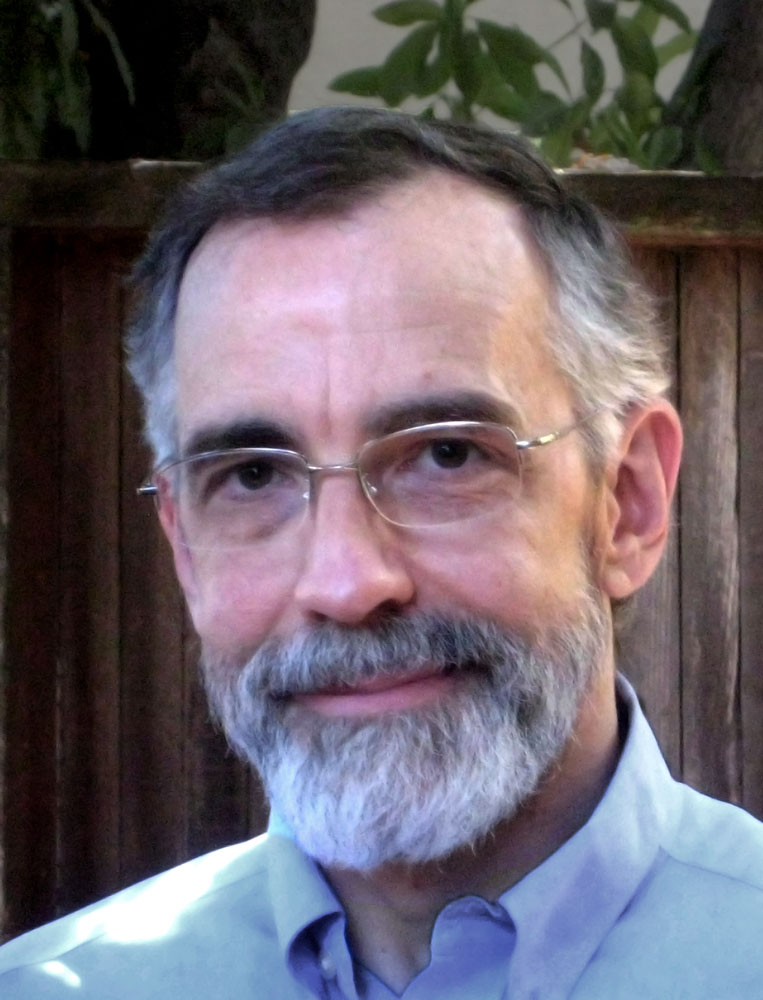
- Drexler in 2013
- Born: April 25, 1955 (age 71); Oakland, California, U.S.
- Citizenship: United States
- Education: Massachusetts Institute of Technology (BS, MS, PhD)
- Known for: Foresight Institute
- Spouses: Christine Peterson (divorced)
- Scientific career
- Fields: Engineering, molecular nanotechnology
- Thesis: Molecular Machinery and Manufacturing With Applications to Computation (1991)
- Doctoral advisor: Marvin Minsky

Kim Eric Drexler (born April 25, 1955) is an American engineer known for his work on molecular nanotechnology (MNT) and his studies of its potential in the 1970s and 1980s. His 1991 doctoral thesis at Massachusetts Institute of Technology (MIT) was revised and published as the book Nanosystems: Molecular Machinery, Manufacturing and Computation (1992), which received the Association of American Publishers award for Best Computer Science Book of 1992. He has been called the "godfather of nanotechnology".

== Life and work ==
K. Eric Drexler was strongly influenced by The Limits to Growth in the early 1970s. During his first year at Massachusetts Institute of Technology, he sought out someone who was working on extraterrestrial resources. He found Gerard K. O'Neill of Princeton University, a physicist known for his work on storage rings for particle accelerators and his work on the concepts of space colonization. Drexler participated in NASA summer studies on space colonies in 1975 and 1976. He fabricated metal thin films to demonstrate the potential of high-performance solar sails. He was active in space politics, helping the L5 Society oppose the Moon Treaty. Besides working with O'Neill to build a mass driver prototype, Drexler contributed papers to Space Manufacturing conferences at Princeton. The 1977 and 1979 papers were co-authored with Keith Henson. Patents were issued on both subjects, vapor phase fabrication and space radiators.

During the late 1970s, Drexler began to develop ideas about molecular nanotechnology (MNT). In 1979, he encountered Richard Feynman's provocative 1959 talk "There's Plenty of Room at the Bottom". In 1981, Drexler wrote a research article, published in Proceedings of the National Academy of Sciences, "Molecular engineering: An approach to the development of general capabilities for molecular manipulation". The paper proposed using designed proteins as a route to molecular machinery able to position reactive groups with atomic precision.

The term "nano-technology" had been coined by Norio Taniguchi in 1974, and Drexler used a related term in his 1986 book Engines of Creation: The Coming Era of Nanotechnology to describe what later became known as molecular nanotechnology (MNT). In that book, he proposed the idea of a nanoscale "assembler" which would be able to build a copy of itself and of other items of arbitrary complexity. He also first published the term "grey goo" to describe what might happen if a hypothetical self-replicating molecular assembler went out of control. He has subsequently tried to clarify his concerns about out-of-control self-replicators, and make the case that molecular manufacturing does not require such devices.

In 1986, Drexler co-founded the Foresight Institute with Christine Peterson.

In a 2019 report for the Future of Humanity Institute, Drexler proposed "comprehensive AI services" (CAIS), a model of general intelligence based on a range of AI services, including services for developing further AI systems.

=== Education ===
Drexler holds three degrees from MIT. He received his B.S. in Interdisciplinary Sciences in 1977 and his M.S. in 1979 in Astro/Aerospace Engineering with a master's thesis titled "Design of a High Performance Solar Sail System". In 1991, he earned a Ph.D. through the MIT Media Lab (formally, the Media Arts and Sciences Section, School of Architecture and Planning) after the department of electrical engineering and computer science refused to approve Drexler's plan of study.

His Ph.D. work was the first doctoral degree on the topic of molecular nanotechnology and his thesis, "Molecular Machinery and Manufacturing with Applications to Computation", was published (with minor editing) as Nanosystems: Molecular Machinery, Manufacturing and Computation (1992), which received the Association of American Publishers award for Best Computer Science Book of 1992.

=== Personal life ===
Drexler married Christine Peterson. The marriage lasted 21 years before they divorced.

Drexler has arranged to be cryonically preserved after death.

== Reception ==
Drexler's work on nanotechnology was criticized as naive by Nobel Prize winner Richard Smalley in a 2001 Scientific American article. Smalley first argued that "fat fingers" made MNT impossible. He later argued that nanomachines would have to resemble chemical enzymes more than Drexler's assemblers and could only work in water. Drexler maintained that both were straw man arguments, and in the case of enzymes, wrote that "Prof. Klibanov wrote in 1994, ' ... using an enzyme in organic solvents eliminates several obstacles ... '" Drexler had difficulty in getting Smalley to respond, but in December 2003, Chemical & Engineering News carried a four-part debate. Ray Kurzweil disputes Smalley's arguments.

The National Academies of Sciences, Engineering, and Medicine, in its 2006 review of the National Nanotechnology Initiative, argues that it is difficult to predict the future capabilities of nanotechnology:

Although theoretical calculations can be made today, the eventually attainable range of chemical reaction cycles, error rates, speed of operation, and thermodynamic efficiencies of such bottom-up manufacturing systems cannot be reliably predicted at this time. Thus, the eventually attainable perfection and complexity of manufactured products, while they can be calculated in theory, cannot be predicted with confidence. Finally, the optimum research paths that might lead to systems which greatly exceed the thermodynamic efficiencies and other capabilities of biological systems cannot be reliably predicted at this time. Research funding that is based on the ability of investigators to produce experimental demonstrations that link to abstract models and guide long-term vision is most appropriate to achieve this goal.

=== In science fiction ===
Drexler and his work on nanotechnology have been referenced in various media, particularly in science fiction literature. In Neal Stephenson's science fiction novel The Diamond Age, he is portrayed as one of the heroes of a future world shaped by nanotechnology. In the science fiction novel Newton's Wake by Ken MacLeod, a 'drexler' is a nanotech assembler of almost anything that can fit in the volume of the particular machine—from socks to starships. Drexler is also mentioned in the science fiction book Decipher by Stel Pavlou; his book is mentioned as one of the starting points of nanomachine construction, as well as giving a better understanding of the way carbon 60 was to be applied. James Rollins references Drexler's Engines of Creation in his novel Excavation, using his theory of a molecular machine in two sections as a possible explanation for the mysterious "Substance Z" in the story. He is also mentioned in Timothy Leary's Design for Dying, and in Michael Crichton's 2002 novel Prey.

Drexler was mentioned in DC Comics' Doom Patrol in 1992. The Drexler Facility (ドレクサー機関) of molecular nanotechnology research in the Japanese eroge visual novels Baldr Sky is named after him. The "Assemblers" are its key invention.

== Works ==
- Engines of Creation (1986)
  - Available online at e-drexler.com
  - Available online in Chinese as 创造的发动机
  - Available online in Italian as MOTORI DI CREAZIONE: L’era prossima della nanotecnologia
- The Canvas of the Night (1990), (ar) Project Solar Sail, ed. Arthur C. Clarke, NAL/Roc (ISBN 0451450027) Science Fiction.
- Unbounding the Future (1991; with Christine Peterson and Gayle Pergamit) (ISBN 0-688-12573-5)
  - Available online with free download at Unbounding the Future: the Nanotechnology Revolution
- Nanosystems: Molecular Machinery, Manufacturing and Computation (1992)
  - Available online at nanosyste.ms
  - Sample chapters and a table of contents are available online at e.drexler.com
  - Drexler's doctoral thesis, Molecular Machinery and Manufacturing with Applications to Computation, an earlier version of the text that became Nanosystems, is available online
- Engines of Creation 2.0: The Coming Era of Nanotechnology - Updated and Expanded, K. Eric Drexler, 647 pages, (February 2007)
- Radical Abundance: How a Revolution in Nanotechnology Will Change Civilization, May 7, 2013, ISBN 1610391136
- Reframing Superintelligence: Comprehensive AI Services as General Intelligence, K. Eric Drexler, Technical Report #2019-1, Future of Humanity Institute, University of Oxford, 210 pages (2019)
- Molecular Science and Engineering Platform One (MSEP.one), (October 2024), molecular design software and editor, free and open-source software with an MIT License; built on the Godot open-source game engine.

== See also ==
- Chemical vapor deposition, a type of "vapor phase fabrication"
- Foresight Institute
- AI safety
