= Productive nanosystems =

Atomically-precise manufacturing system

In 2007, productive nanosystems were defined as functional nanoscale systems that make atomically-specified structures and devices under programmatic control, i.e., performing atomically precise manufacturing. As of 2015, such devices were only hypothetical, and productive nanosystems represented a more advanced approach among several to perform Atomically Precise Manufacturing. A workshop on Integrated Nanosystems for Atomically Precise Manufacturing was held by the Department of Energy in 2015.

Present-day technologies are limited in various ways. Large atomically precise structures (that is, virtually defect-free) do not exist. Complex 3D nanoscale structures exist in the form of folded linear molecules such as DNA origami and proteins. As of 2026, it was also possible to build very small atomically precise structures using scanning probe microscopy to construct molecules such as FeCO and polyyne, or to perform hydrogen depassivation lithography. But it is not yet possible to combine components in a systematic way to build larger, more complex systems.

Principles of physics and examples from nature both suggest that it will be possible to extend atomically precise fabrication to more complex products of larger size, involving a wider range of materials. An example of progress in this direction would be Christian Schafmeister's work on bis-peptides.

== Stages of progress in nanotechnology ==
In 2005, Mihail Roco, one of the architects of the USA's National Nanotechnology Initiative, proposed four states of nanotechnology that seem to parallel the technical progress of the Industrial Revolution, of which productive nanosystems is the most advanced.

1. Passive nanostructures - nanoparticles and nanotubes that provide added strength, electrical and thermal conductivity, toughness, hydrophilic/phobic and/or other properties that emerge from their nanoscale structure.

2. Active nanodevices - nanostructures that change states in order to transform energy, information, and/or to perform useful functions. There is some debate about whether or not state-of-the art integrated circuits qualify here, since they operate despite emergent nanoscale properties, not because of them. Therefore, the argument goes, they don't qualify as "novel" nanoscale properties, even though the devices themselves are between one and a hundred nanometers.

3. Complex nanomachines - the assembly of different nanodevices into a nanosystem to accomplish a complex function. Some would argue that Zettl's machines fit in this category; others argue that modern microprocessors and FPGAs also fit.

4. Systems of nanosystems/Productive nanosystems - these will be complex nanosystems that produce atomically precise parts for other nanosystems, not necessarily using novel nanoscale-emergent properties, but well-understood fundamentals of manufacturing. Because of the discrete (i.e. atomic) nature of matter and the possibility of exponential growth, this stage is seen as the basis of another industrial revolution. There are currently many different approaches to building productive nanosystems: including top-down approaches like Patterned atomic layer epitaxy and Diamondoid Mechanosynthesis. There are also bottom-up approaches like DNA Origami and Bis-peptide Synthesis.

A fifth step, info/bio/nano convergence, was later introduced by Roco as the convergence of the three most revolutionary technologies according to Roco.

== See also ==
- Clanking replicator
- Ribosome
- Synthetic biology
