= Food industry =

Collective term for diverse businesses that supply much of the world's food

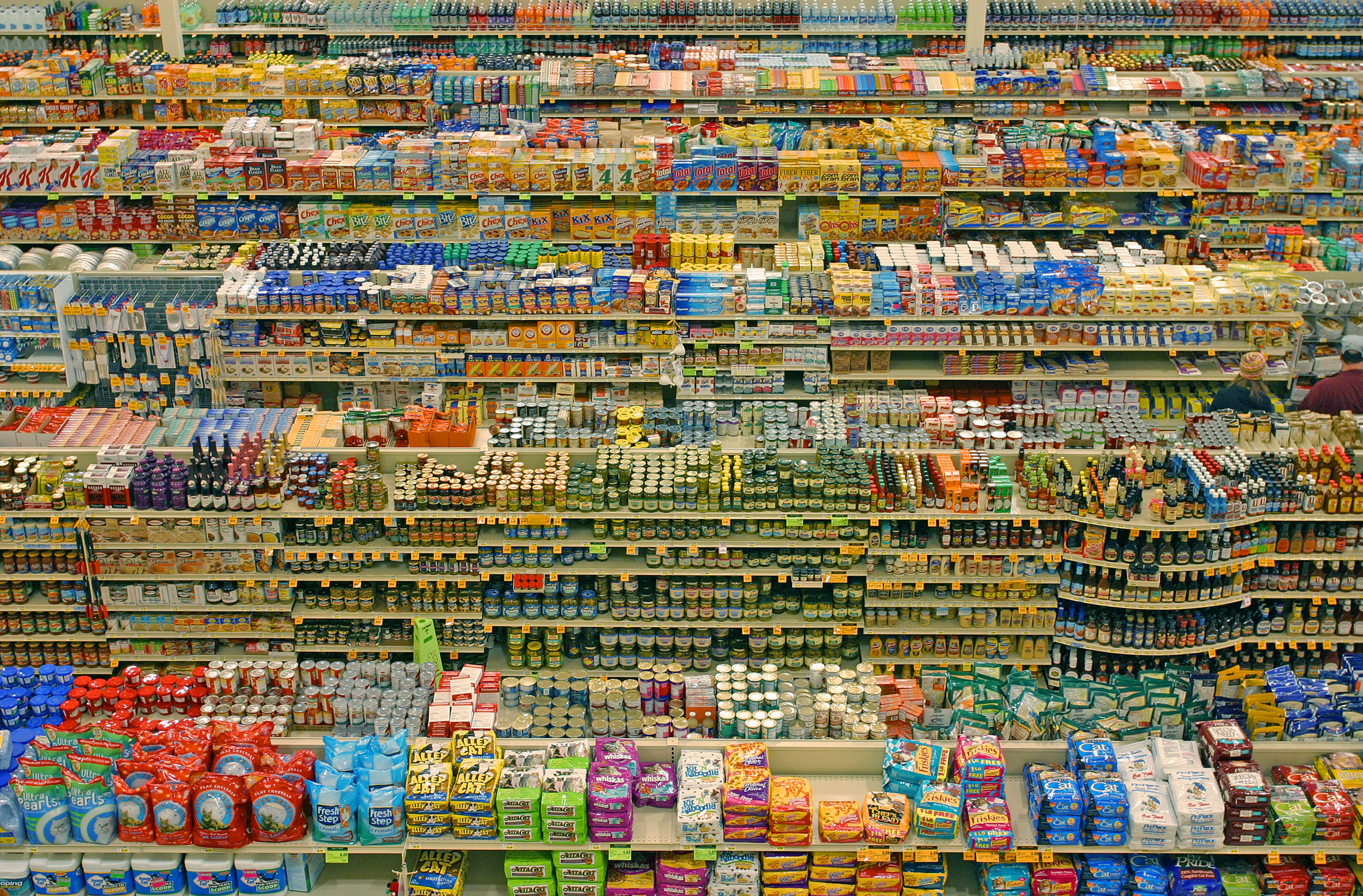
Packaged food aisles at a grocery store in the United States

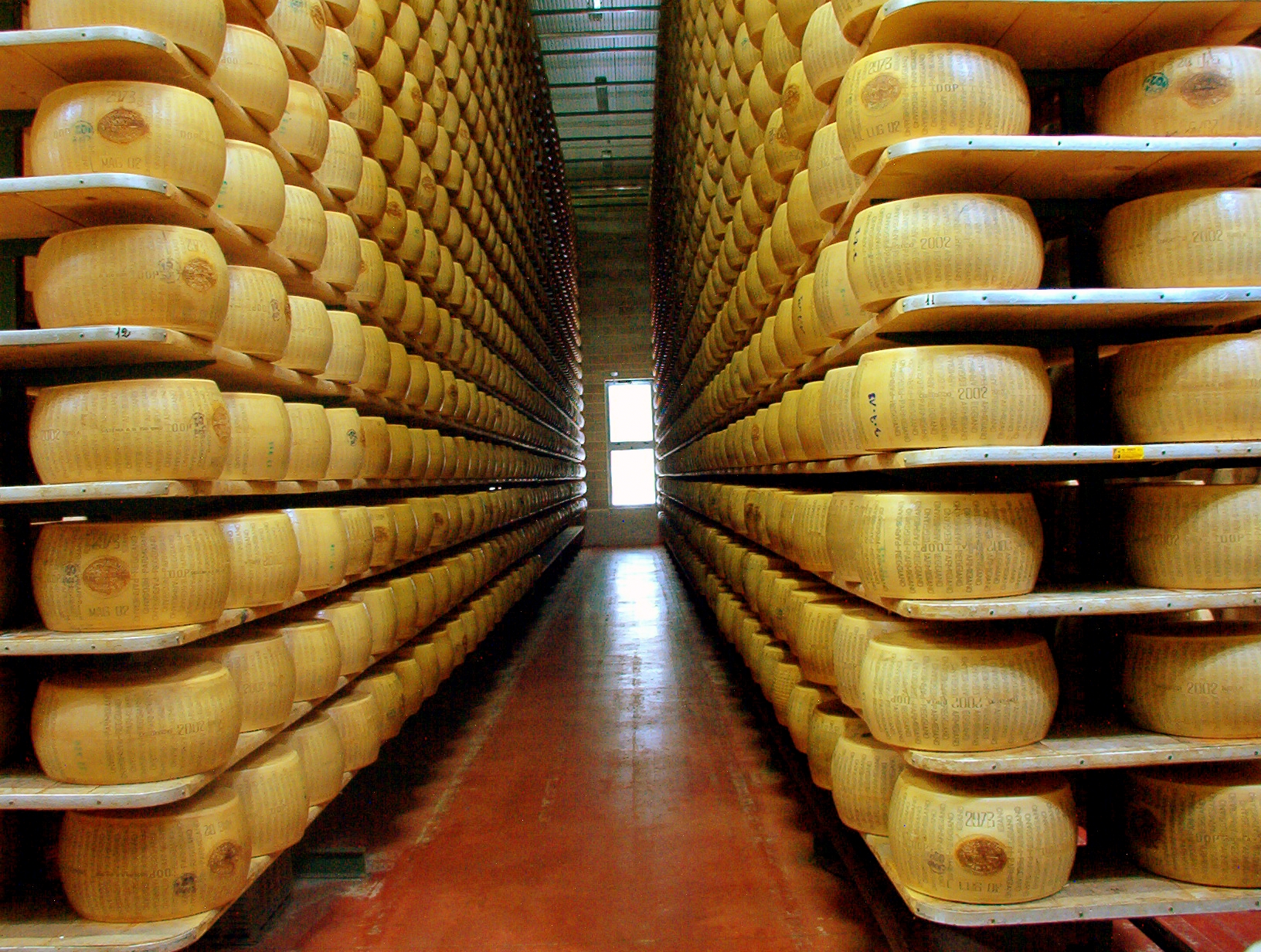
Parmigiano Reggiano cheese produced in a modern factory

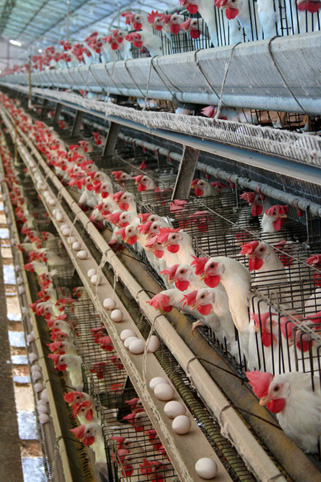
Battery cages in Brazil, an example of intensive animal farming

The food industry is a complex, global network of diverse businesses that supplies most of the food consumed by the world's population. The food industry today has become highly diversified, with manufacturing ranging from small, traditional, family-run activities that are highly labour-intensive, to large, capital-intensive and highly mechanized industrial processes. Many food industries depend almost entirely on local agriculture, animal farms, produce, and/or fishing.

The food industry includes:

- Agriculture: raising crops, livestock, and seafood.
- Manufacturing: agrichemicals, agricultural construction, farm machinery and supplies, seed, etc.
- Food processing: preparation of fresh products for market, and manufacture of prepared food products
- Marketing: promotion of generic products (e.g., milk board), new products, advertising, marketing campaigns, packaging, public relations, etc.
- Wholesale and food distribution: logistics, transportation, warehousing
- Food service (which includes catering)
- Grocery, farmers' markets, public markets and other retailing
- Regulation: local, regional, national, and international rules and regulations for food production and sale, including food quality, food security, food safety, marketing/advertising, and industry lobbying activities
- Education: academic, consultancy, vocational
- Research and development: food science, food microbiology, food technology, food chemistry, and food engineering
- Financial services: credit, insurance.

It is challenging to find an inclusive way to cover all aspects of food production and sale. The UK Food Standards Agency describes it as "the whole food industry – from farming and food production, packaging and distribution, to retail and catering". The Economic Research Service of the USDA uses the term food system to describe the same thing, stating: "The U.S. food system is a complex network of farmers and the industries that link to them. Those links include makers of farm equipment and chemicals as well as firms that provide services to agribusinesses, such as providers of transportation and financial services. The system also includes the food marketing industries that link farms to consumers, and which include food and fiber processors, wholesalers, retailers, and foodservice establishments." Areas of research such as food grading, food preservation, food rheology, food storage directly deal with the quality and maintenance of quality overlapping many of the above processes.

Only subsistence farmers, those who survive on what they grow, and hunter-gatherers can be considered outside the scope of the modern food industry.

The dominant companies in the food industry have sometimes been referred to as Big Food, a term coined by the writer Neil Hamilton.

== Food production ==
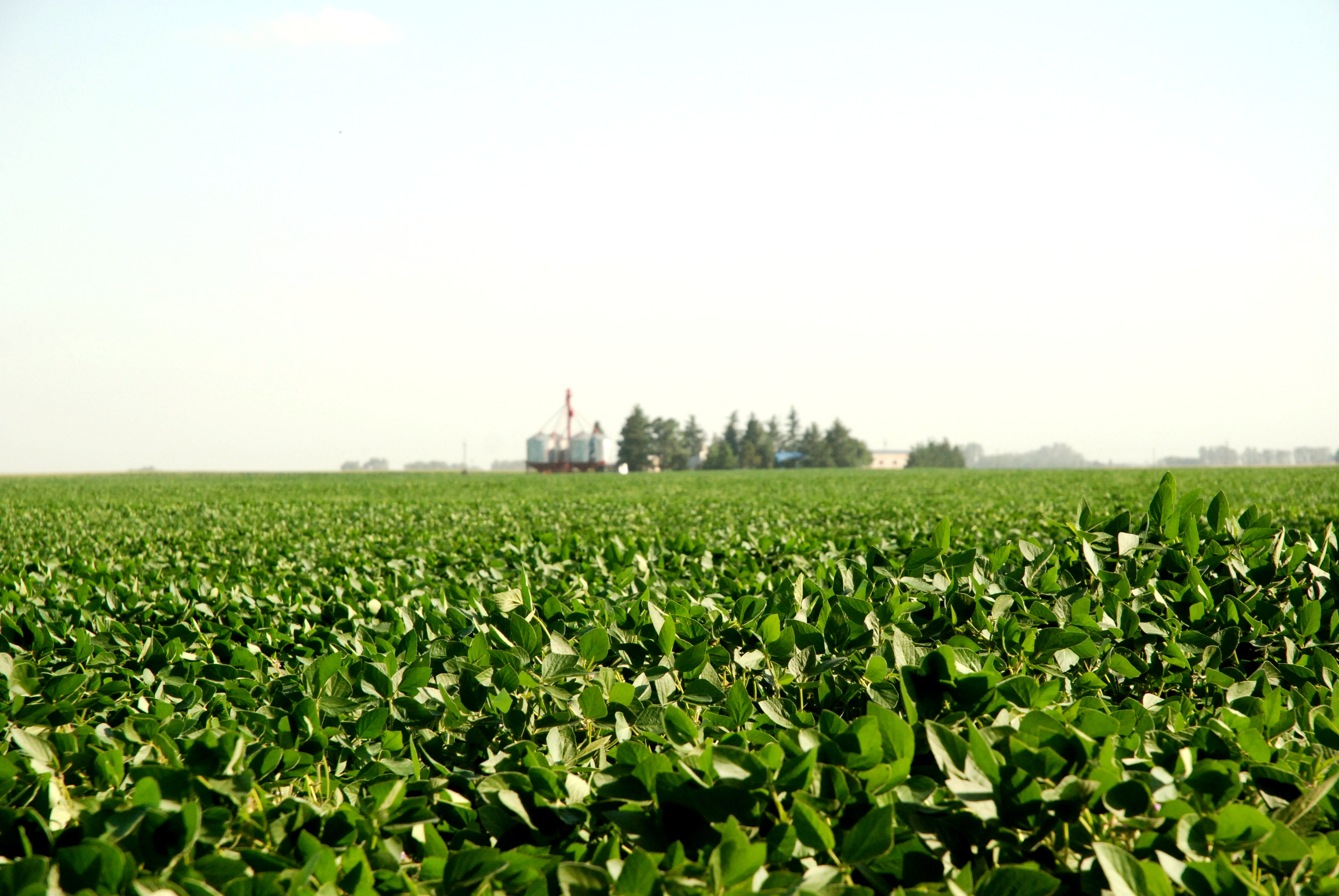
A soybean field in Argentina

Most food produced for the food industry comes from commodity crops using conventional agricultural practices. Agriculture is the process of producing food, feeding products, fiber and other desired products by the cultivation of certain plants and the raising of domesticated animals (livestock). On average, 83% of the food consumed by humans is produced using terrestrial agriculture. In addition to terrestrial agriculture, aquaculture and fishing play vital roles in global food production. Aquaculture involves the cultivation of aquatic organisms such as fish, shrimp, and mollusks in controlled environments like ponds, tanks, or cages. It contributes significantly to the world's seafood supply and provides an important source of protein for human consumption. Fishing, on the other hand, relies on harvesting wild aquatic species from oceans, rivers, and lakes, further diversifying the sources of food for human populations and supporting livelihoods in coastal communities worldwide. Together, terrestrial agriculture, aquaculture, and fishing collectively ensure a diverse and ample supply of food to meet the dietary needs of people across the globe.

World population supported with and without synthetic nitrogen fertilizers.

Scientists, inventors, and others devoted to improving farming methods and implements are also said to be engaged in agriculture. One in three people worldwide are employed in agriculture, yet it only contributes 3% to global GDP. In 2017, on average, agriculture contributes 4% of national GDPs. Global agricultural production is responsible for between 14 and 28% of global greenhouse gas emissions, making it one of the largest contributors to global warming, in large part due to conventional agricultural practices, including nitrogen fertilizers and poor land management.

Agronomy is the science and technology of producing and using plants for food, fuel, fibre, and land reclamation. Agronomy encompasses work in the areas of plant genetics, plant physiology, meteorology, and soil science. Agronomy is the application of a combination of sciences. Agronomists today are involved with many issues including producing food, creating healthier food, managing the environmental impact of agriculture, and extracting energy from plants.

== Food processing ==
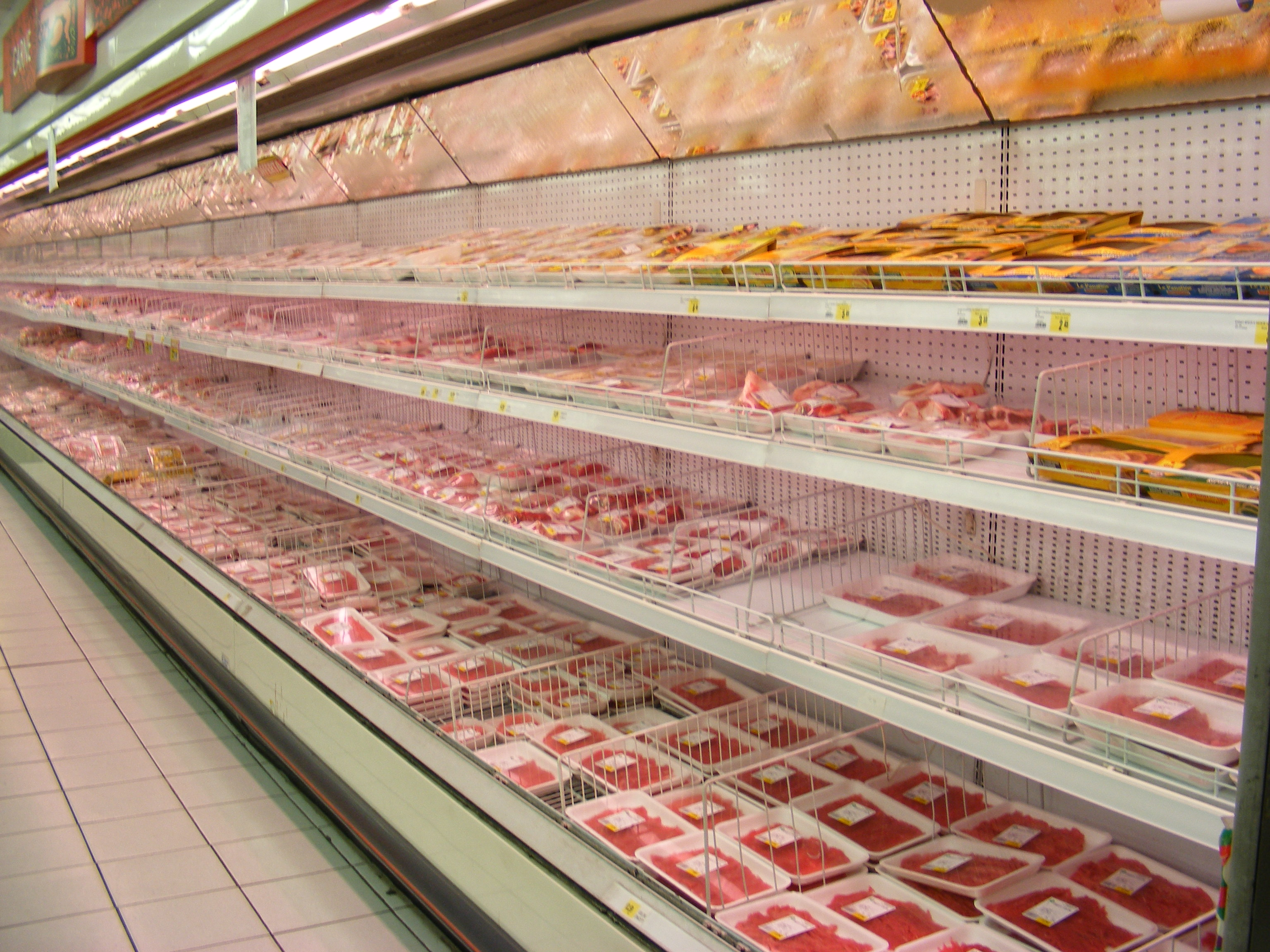
Packaged meat in a supermarket

Food processing includes the methods and techniques used to transform raw ingredients into food for human consumption. Food processing takes clean, harvested or slaughtered and butchered components and uses them to produce marketable food products. There are several different ways in which food can be produced.

One-off production: this method is used when customers make an order for something to be made to their own specifications, for example, a wedding cake. The making of one-off products could take days depending on how intricate the design is.

Batch production: this method is used when the size of the market for a product is not clear, and where there is a range within a product line. A certain number of the same goods will be produced to make up a batch or run, for example a bakery may bake a limited number of cupcakes. This method involves estimating consumer demand.

Mass production: this method is used when there is a mass market for a large number of identical products, for example chocolate bars, ready meals and canned food. The product passes from one stage of production to another along a production line.

Just-in-time (JIT) (production): this method of production is mainly used in restaurants. All components of the product are available in-house and the customer chooses what they want in the product. It is then prepared in a kitchen, or in front of the buyer as in sandwich delicatessens, pizzerias, and sushi bars.

== Impact ==
The food industry has a large influence on consumerism. Its contribution to climate change has also been reported: it is estimated that the food industry produces almost 19 times more carbon dioxide annually than commercial aviation does.

== Criticism ==
=== Media ===
There are a number of books, film, TV and web-related exposés and critiques of the food industry, including:

- Eat This, Not That (nonfiction series published in Men's Health magazine)
- Fast Food Nation (2001 nonfiction book)
  - Chew On This (2005 book adaptation of Fast Food Nation for younger readers)
  - Fast Food Nation (2006 documentary film)
- Food, Inc. (2008 documentary film)
- Panic Nation (2006 nonfiction book)
- Super Size Me (2004 documentary film)
- Forks over Knives (2011 documentary film)
- The Jungle (1906 novel by Upton Sinclair that exposed health violations and unsanitary practices in the American meat packing industry during the early 20th century, based on his investigation for a socialist newspaper)

=== Corporate and financial influence ===
The Bretton Woods institutions—the World Bank and International Monetary Fund—play a large role in how the food industry functions today. These global funds were born after World War II, to help rebuild Europe and prevent another Great Depression. Overall, their main purpose was to stabilize economies. The IMF provided short-term loans while the World Bank was focused on larger projects that would bring electricity back to cities, roads, and other "essential" needs. The World Bank's mission and purpose transformed, however, as its president Robert McNamara implemented a system of structural adjustment loans. In accepting loans from the World Bank, countries, especially in the Global South, became economically, politically, and socially tied to the West. Many countries struggled to pay back their loans, beginning the process of global debt, privatization, and the downfall of local economies. As a result of Western intervention, many small-scale farmers have been displaced, as U.S. corporations have bought out land in other countries and continued to monopolize food. Today, several multinational corporations have introduced agricultural technologies to developing countries including improved seeds, chemical fertilizers and pesticides, and crop production methods.

Organizations such as The American Academy of Family Physicians (AAFP) have been criticized for accepting monetary donations from companies within the food industry, such as Coca-Cola. These donations have been criticized for creating a conflict of interest and favoring an interest such as financial gains.

== Policy ==
In 2020 scientists reported that reducing emissions from the global food system is essential to achieving the Paris Agreement's climate goals. In 2020, an evidence review for the European Union's Scientific Advice Mechanism found that, without significant change, emissions would increase by 30–40% by 2050 due to population growth and changing consumption patterns, and concluded that "the combined environmental cost of food production is estimated to amount to some $12 trillion per year, increasing to $16 trillion by 2050". The IPCC's and the EU's reports concluded that adapting the food system to reduce greenhouse gas emissions impacts and food security concerns, while shifting towards a sustainable diet, is feasible.

=== Regulation ===
Since World War II, agriculture in the United States and the entire national food system in its entirety has been characterized by models that focus on monetary profitability at the expense of social and environmental integrity. Regulations exist to protect consumers and somewhat balance this economic orientation with public interests for food quality, food security, food safety, animal well-being, environmental protection and health.

=== Proactive guidance ===
In 2020, researchers published projections and models of potential impacts of policy-dependent mechanisms of modulation, or lack thereof, of how, where, and what food is produced. They analyzed policy-effects for specific regions or nations such as reduction of meat production and consumption, reductions in food waste and loss, increases in crop yields and international land-use planning. Their conclusions include that raising agricultural yields is highly beneficial for biodiversity-conservation in sub-Saharan Africa while measures leading to shifts of diets are highly beneficial in North America and that global coordination and rapid action are necessary.

== Wholesale and distribution ==
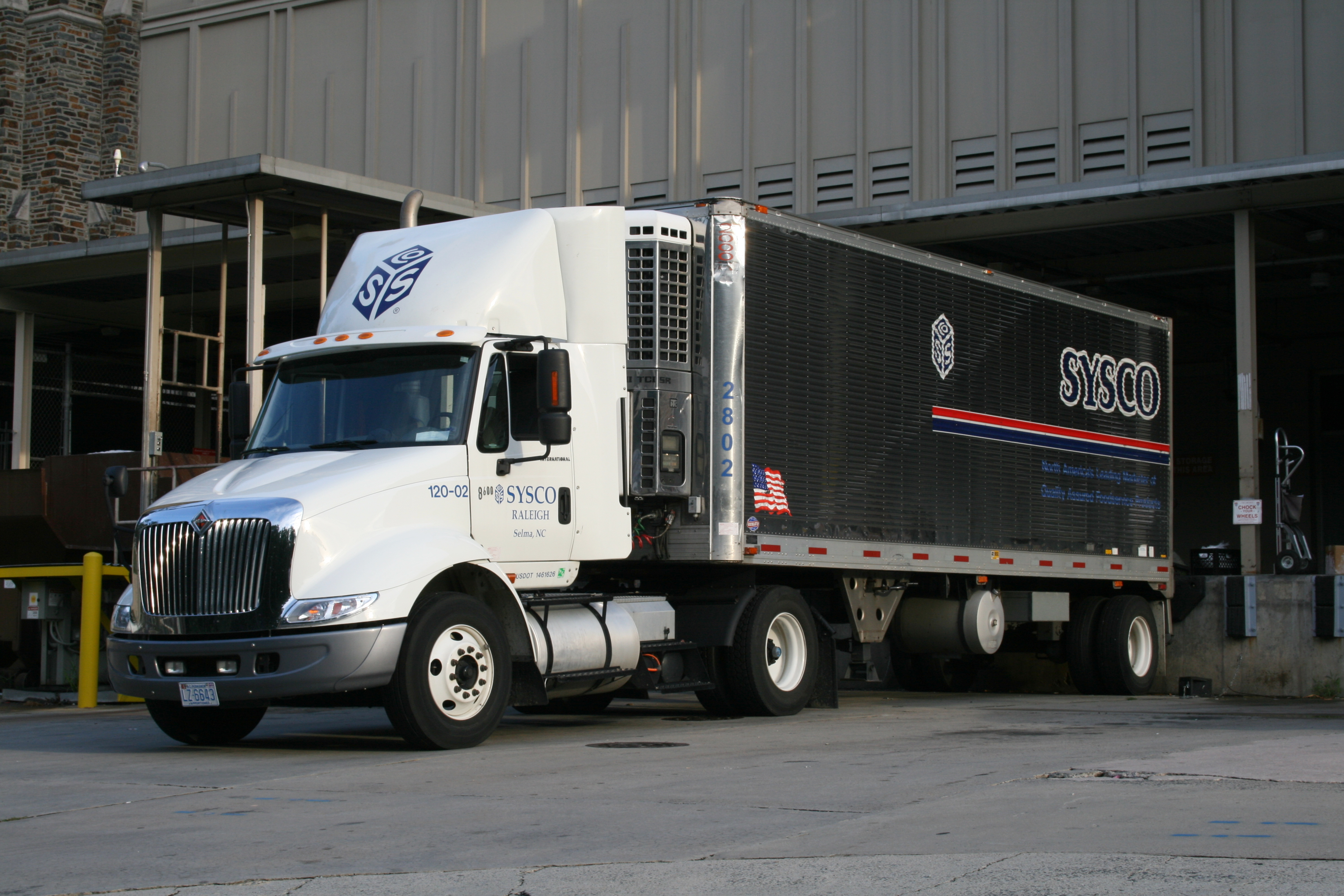
A foodservice truck at a loading dock. Road transportation is often used in food distribution.

A vast global cargo network connects the numerous parts of the industry. These include suppliers, manufacturers, warehousers, retailers and the end consumers.) Wholesale markets for fresh food products have tended to decline in importance in urbanizing countries, including Latin America and some Asian countries as a result of the growth of supermarkets, which procure directly from farmers or through preferred suppliers, rather than going through markets.

The constant and uninterrupted flow of product from distribution centers to store locations is a critical link in food industry operations. Distribution centers run more efficiently, throughput can be increased, costs can be lowered, and manpower better utilized if the proper steps are taken when setting up a material handling system in a warehouse.

== Retail ==
With worldwide urbanization, food buying is increasingly removed from food production. During the 20th century, the supermarket became the defining retail element of the food industry. There, tens of thousands of products are gathered in one location, in continuous, year-round supply.

Food preparation is another area where the change in recent decades has been dramatic. Today, two food industry sectors are in apparent competition for the retail food dollar. The grocery industry sells fresh and largely raw products for consumers to use as ingredients in home cooking. The food service industry, by contrast, offers prepared food, either as finished products or as partially prepared components for final "assembly". Restaurants, cafes, bakeries and mobile food trucks provide opportunities for consumers to purchase food.

In the 21st century online grocery stores emerged and digital technologies for community-supported agriculture have enabled farmers to directly sell produce. Some online grocery stores have voluntarily set social goals or values beyond meeting consumer demand and the accumulation of profit.

== Food industry technologies ==
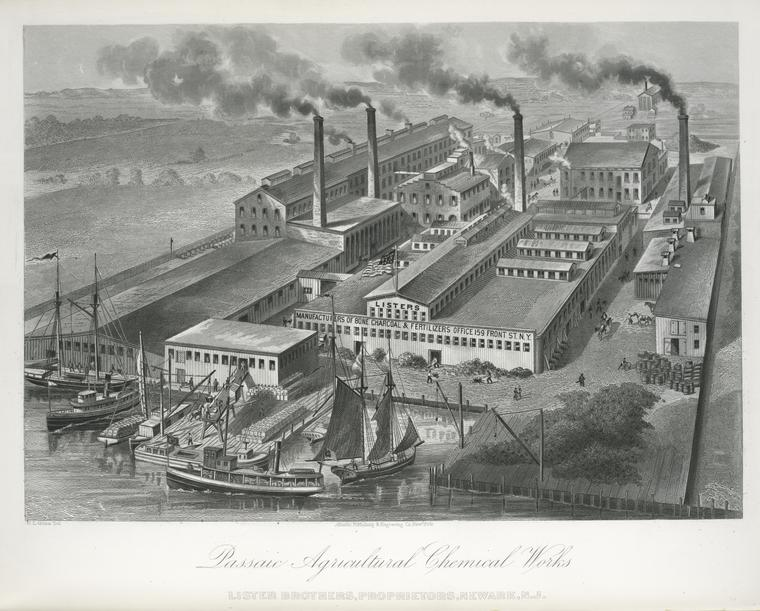
An American agrochemical factory in 1876

Modern food production is defined by sophisticated technologies. These include many areas. Agricultural machinery, originally led by the tractor, has practically eliminated human labor in many areas of production. Biotechnology is driving much change, in areas as diverse as agrochemicals, plant breeding and food processing. Many other types of technology are also involved, to the point where it is hard to find an area that does not have a direct impact on the food industry. As in other fields, computer technology is also a central force. Other than that, there few more modern technologies that can help to improve the industry as well which are, robotics and automation, blockchain, nanotech, 3D printing, artificial intelligence, smart farming and others. These new technologies can improve the industry in the following ways:

1. Robotics and automation: Robotics and automation are being used to automate processes such as packaging, sorting, and quality control, which reduces labor costs and increases efficiency. These technologies also reduce the likelihood of contamination by reducing human contact with food.
1. Blockchain: Blockchain technology is being used to improve food safety by providing transparency in the supply chain. This technology allows for real-time tracking of food products, from farm to table, which helps to identify any potential safety hazards and enables quick response to any issues.
1. Nanotechnology: Nanotechnology is being used to develop new packaging materials that can extend the shelf life of food and reduce food waste. These materials can also be designed to be biodegradable, reducing the environmental impact of packaging.
2. 3D printing: 3D printing is being used to create custom food products and to make food production more efficient. With 3D printing, it is possible to create complex shapes and designs that would be difficult to achieve with traditional manufacturing techniques.
3. Artificial intelligence: (AI) is being used to analyze large amounts of data in the food industry, which can help to identify trends and patterns. This technology can be used to optimize processes and to improve the quality and safety of food products.
4. Smart farming: Smart farming involves the use of sensors and data analytics to optimize crop yields and reduce waste. This technology can help farmers to make more informed decisions about when to plant, water, and harvest crops, which can improve the efficiency and sustainability of agriculture.

== Marketing ==
As consumers grow increasingly removed from food production, the role of product creation, advertising, and publicity become the primary vehicles for information about food. With processed food as the dominant category, marketers have almost infinite possibilities in product creation. Of the food advertised to children on television, 73% is fast or convenience foods.

One of the main challenges in food industry marketing is the high level of competition in the market. Companies must differentiate themselves from their competitors by offering unique products or using innovative marketing techniques. For example, many food companies are now using social media platforms to promote their products and engage with customers.

Another important aspect of food industry marketing is understanding consumer behavior and preferences. This includes factors such as age, gender, income, and cultural background. Companies must also be aware of changing consumer trends and adapt their marketing strategies accordingly.

== Labor and education ==
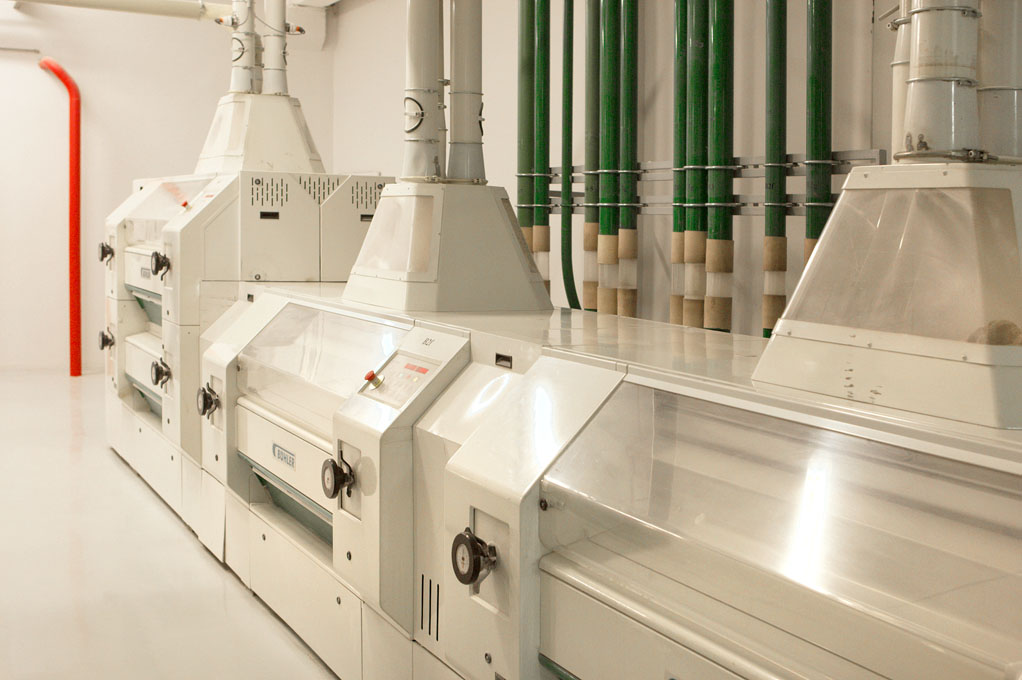
Equipment at Tartu Mill. Modern food processing factories are often highly automated.

Until the last 100 years, agriculture was labor-intensive. Farming was a common occupation and millions of people were involved in food production. Farmers, largely trained from generation to generation, carried on the family business. That situation has changed dramatically today. In the United States in 1870, 70–80% of the population was employed in agriculture. As of 2021, less than 2% of the population is directly employed in agriculture, and about 83% of the population lives in cities.

== See also ==
- Agrifood systems
- Agroindustry
- Agricultural economics
- Agricultural expansion
- Dietary supplement
- Factory farming
- Food fortification, also called nutrification
- Geography of food
- Local food
- Ultra-processed food
