= Nanoneuronics =

Sub-field of neuronics

Nanoneuronics is an emerging discipline involving the application of nanometer-scale methods, materials, science and technology to neurons and neural tissue in order to design and develop advanced medical applications.

== Overview ==
Nanoneuronics is a new discipline of engineering that aims to harness the collaborative power and knowledge of nanotechnology, neuroscience, electrical engineering, neural engineering and ethics for the design and development of advanced medical interventions with the nervous system. Although non-invasive approaches to the nervous system have been effective for diagnosis and therapy in many treatments, an overwhelming number of severe neurological conditions will likely require invasive approaches for effective therapy.

== History ==
The term “nanoneuronics” was coined in 2006 by Prof. Richard Magin, at the time the head of the Bioengineering Department at the University of Illinois at Chicago. The National Science Foundation has approved initial funding toward the study of ways in which experts in these fields can work together to promote interdisciplinary research.
