= Nanotechnology in agriculture =

Nanoparticles and nanotechnology have a wide variety of applications, including applications in agriculture. In general, a nanoparticle is defined as any particle where one characteristic dimension is 100nm or less. Because of their unique size, these particles begin to exhibit properties that their larger counterparts may not. Due to their scale, quantum mechanical interactions become more important than classic mechanical forces, allowing for the prevalence of unique physical and chemical properties due to their extremely high surface-to-body ratio. Properties such as cation exchange capacity, enhanced diffusion, ion adsorption, and complexation are enhanced when operating at nanoscale.

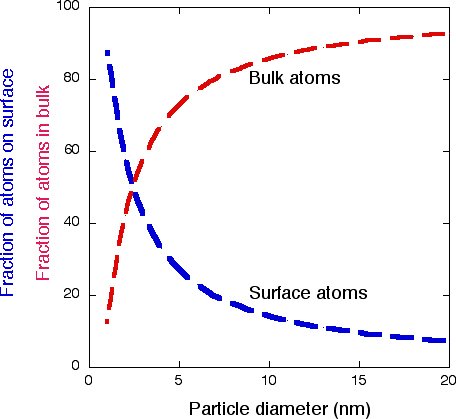
Comparison of surface area between bulk materials and nanoparticles.

This is primarily the consequence of a high proportion of atoms being present on the surface, with an increased proportion of sites operating at higher reactivities with respect to processes such as adsorption processes and electrochemical interactions. Nanoparticles are promising candidates for implementation in agriculture. Because many organic functions such as ion exchange and plant gene expression operate on small scales, nanomaterials offer a toolset that works at just the right scale to provide efficient, targeted delivery to living cells. Current areas of focus of nanotechnology development in the agricultural industry include development of environmentally conscious nano fertilizers to provide efficient ion, and nutrient delivery into plant cells, and plant gene transformations to produce plants with desirable genes such as drought resistance and accelerated growth cycles.

Nanotechnology in agriculture has been gaining traction due to the limitations that traditional farming methods impose at both the scientific and policy level. Nanotechnology aims to address productivity and mitigate damage on local ecosystems. With the global population on the rise, it is necessary to make advancements in sustainable farming methods that generate higher yields in order to meet the rising food demand. Although there are seemingly numerous advantages in using nanotechnology in this sector, certain sustainability and ethical concerns around the topic cannot be ignored. The extent of their transport and interaction within their surrounding environments, as well as potential phytotoxicity and bioaccumulation of nanoparticles in food systems are not fully known. Ethical considerations also arise when we consider public discourse and regulatory challenges. The accessibility and affordability of nanotechnology-based agricultural solutions could disproportionately benefit large-scale industrial farms, potentially widening socioeconomic disparities with smallholder and Indigenous farmers. Experts emphasize the need for low-cost, scalable innovations that make these technologies accessible to diverse farming communities.

== Chemical Properties of Nanomaterials in Agricultural Use ==
There are multiple properties of nanoparticles that make them effective and sought after for agricultural applications. Their small size, high surface area, and tunable surface chemistry allow for improved efficiency in nutrient delivery, pest control, and environmental remediation. A high surface-to-volume ratio allows for enhanced reactivity, solubility, and absorption, which are key to a thriving agricultural industry. These properties specifically allow for increased nutrient uptake & enhanced plant cell penetration.

These nanomaterials can be made from a variety of chemical structures, with the most prominent being various metal oxides, carbon-based nanomaterials, and organic nanoparticles. Iron is an essential micronutrient, playing a role in chlorophyll synthesis, electron transport, and enzyme activation, and a deficiency can lead to reduced growth and crop yields. Iron oxide nanoparticles have been shown to improve seed germination, enhancing shoot and root development more than traditional iron supplements do. These particles can increase rice plant growth by enhancing iron bioavailability, as these nanoparticles are soil stable and penetrate root epidermal cells, ensuring sufficient nutrient transport to other parts of the plant. Other elements, such as silver and copper, are becoming more widely used because of their antifungal and antimicrobial properties, making them useful in terms of disease and pest prevention. Specifically, the release of silver ions disrupts bacterial and fungal cell membranes that prevents diseases like powdery mildew, bacterial blight, and leaf spot. Nanoparticles can also be chemically modified to control properties like solubility. Chitosan or other polymer coatings have been shown to improve biodegradability and nutrient release, and one study shows Chitosan-coated zinc nanoparticles extend the release of zinc, reducing soil toxicity and preventing its over-accumulation in plants.

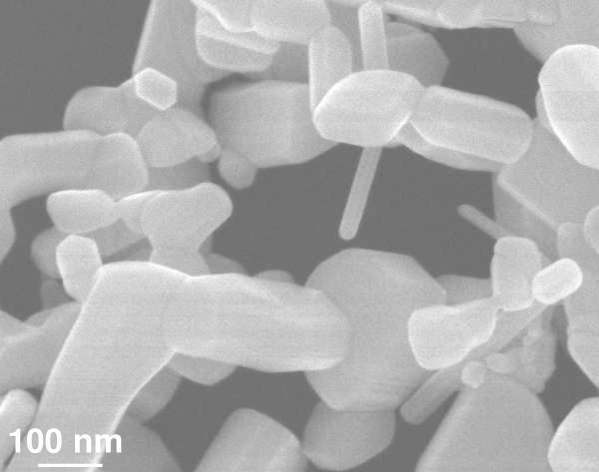
Scanning Electron Microscopy Images of ZnO nanoparticles with a primary particle diameter of 20nm and a specific surface area of 50 m^{2}/g. Electron microscopy of these samples was performed by Scanning Electron Microscopy using a JOEL 7500F Electron Microscope (JOEL Eching, Germany).

At the nanoscale, quantum confinement effects alter electronic, optical, and chemical properties, which allow nanomaterials to be tailored to specific agricultural applications, particularly in crop protection, light absorption, and antimicrobial activity. For example, silver nanoparticles are known to absorb UV light, a useful property for antimicrobial crop coatings. They can also scatter and reflect excess UV radiation, which has been shown to reduce sunburn damage to crops like tomatoes and grapes. Studies have also shown that silver nanoparticle sprays have reduced fungal infections in wheat crops while maintaining low toxicity to beneficial soil microbes. Zinc oxide nanoparticles have a wide bandgap of 3.37 eV, which allows them to regulate photosynthetic activity by enhancing light absorption and electron transport, as well as increasing chlorophyll content.

Part of what makes these materials desirable for applications in agriculture include their environmental stability and degradability. These properties are influenced by a variety of factors, including chemical composition, surface modification, and interactions with soil pH and organic matter; understanding these interactions is crucial for noting pollution control and long-term environmental impact. As for chemical composition and solubility, metal-based particles can dissolve, releasing ions influencing soil and microbial activity, while carbon-based nanomaterials have been shown to absorb heavy metals from contaminated environments and resist degradation for much longer. Polymers such as chitosan or polyethylene glycol are used in coatings to increase water dispersion and prevent particle aggregation, while being selective with functional groups can enhance contaminant absorption. Nanoparticles can interact with substances like clay minerals, organic matter, and soil microbes, influencing their mobility and availability for plant uptake, while higher organic matter content enhances stability by reducing aggregation and sedimentation ^{.}

Soil remediation is one of the biggest sought-after benefits of utilizing nanoparticles in agriculture. The most promising materials include carbon-based nanomaterials and nano-clay materials, all of which exhibit high reactivity and selective adsorption capabilities. The molecular structure of graphene oxide and carbon nanotubes allows capture of metal ions due to high surface areas and strong absorption capacities. Activated carbon-based nanocomposites have been shown to remove up to 90% of heavy metal cadmium ions from water in a short time span of a few hours.

Nano-clay materials, such as montmorillonite-based nanoclays, trap pesticide residues, preventing them from leaching into water sources and maintaining soil fertility. By modifying their surface chemistry, nanoclays retain other harmful chemicals, mitigating impact on surrounding ecosystems. One practical application involves clay-polymer nanocomposites, which have been deployed in farmland runoff control to reduce pesticide and herbicide contamination, protecting nearby water bodies from exposure. These aforementioned properties are essential for agricultural applications—nanotechnology has been applied to create nanofertilizers, nanopesticides, and nanosensors, reducing excess waste, remediating soil conditions, and providing targeted nutrient uptake, reducing toxic conditions.

== Categories and Agricultural Applications ==
=== Nanofertilizers ===
One area of active research in this field is the use of nanofertilizers. Because of the aforementioned special properties of nanoparticles, nanofertilizers can be tuned to have specialized delivery to plants. Conventional fertilizers can be dangerous to the environment because of the sheer amount of runoff that stems from their use. Having a detrimental effect on everything from water quality to air particulate matter, being able to negate runoff from agriculture is extremely important for improving quality of life around the world for millions. For example, runoff from sugar plantations in Florida has spawned the infamous algae bloom called "red tide" in water tributaries across the state, creating respiratory issues in humans and killing vital ecosystems for years.

Nanofertilizers deliver nutrients more efficiently than conventional fertilizers by increasing plant bioavailability and reducing leaching into water systems, and their small-scale size allows them to pass through plant cell walls for nutrient transport. For example, silica (SiO_{2}) nanoparticles bind to soil, allowing retention of essential root macronutrients and water retention such as Nitrogen (N), Phosphorus (P), and Potassium (K) for longer periods of time.

Studies have shown that, in most cases, greater than 50% of the amount of fertilizer applied to soil is lost to the environment, in some cases up to 90%. As mentioned before, this poses extremely negative environmental implications, while also demonstrating the high waste associated with conventional fertilizers. On the other hand, nanofertilizers are able to amend this issue because of their high absorption efficiency into the targeted plant- which is owed to their remarkably high surface area to volume ratios. In a study done on the use of phosphorus nano-fertilizers, absorption efficiencies of up to 90.6% were achieved, making them a highly desirable fertilizer material. Another beneficial aspect of using nanofertilizers is the ability to provide slow release of nutrients into the plant over a 40-50 day time period, rather than the 4-10 day period of conventional fertilizers. This again proves to be beneficial economically, requiring less resources to be devoted to fertilizer transport, and less amount of total fertilizer needed.

As expected with greater ability for nutrient uptake, crops have been found to exhibit greater health when using nanofertilizers over conventional ones. One study analyzed the effect of a potato-specific nano fertilizer composed of a variety of elements including K, P, N, and Mg, in comparison to a control group using their conventional counterparts. The study found that the potato crop which used the nano-fertilizer had an increased crop yield in comparison to the control, as well as more efficient water use and agronomic efficiency, defined as units of yield increased per unit of nutrient applied. In addition, the study found that the nano fertilized potatoes had a higher nutrient content, such as increased starch and ascorbic acid content. Another study analyzed the use of iron-based nanofertilizers in black eyed peas, and determined that root stability increased dramatically in the use of nano fertilizer, as well as chlorophyll content in leaves, thus improving photosynthesis. A different study found that zinc nanofertilizers enhanced photosynthesis rate in maize crops, measured through soluble carbohydrate concentration, likely as a result of the role of zinc in the photosynthesis process.

There are many objects to the use of nanofertilizers, and work needs to be done in the future to make nanofertilizers a consistent, viable alternative to conventional fertilizers. Effective legislation needs to be drafted regulating the use of nanofertilizers, drafting standards for consistent quality and targeted release of nutrients. Further, more studies need to be done to understand the full benefits and potential downsides of nanofertilizers, to gain the full picture in approach of using nanotechnology to benefit agriculture in the future.

=== Nanopesticides ===
Nanopesticides are viewed as being more effective than conventional pesticides, aiming for targeted pest control and chemical delivery while reducing the threat of environmental toxicity. Some nanopesticides utilize a controlled gradual release mechanism through nano-encapsulation, which means pesticides are delivered through a variety of nanocarriers. This extends their effectiveness and reduces the amount of pesticide applications needed. One chitosan-based nano-encapsulated pesticide was able to be stabilized for several weeks, while maintaining efficacy against aphid infestation. Traditional pesticides can often have adverse effects on wildlife, harming insects, birds, and other beneficial pollinators. One solution has been to create pH-sensitive nanocarriers that remain inert in neutral environments, but activate in the alkaline bodies of pests. Nanopesticides also aim to address the problem of chemical adhesion to plant surfaces. Hydrophobicity and degradation from sun and rain can cause runoff into soil and waterways. Research has made advances in electrostatic attraction to plant cuticles, deeper plant tissue penetration, and hydrophilic formulations.

Nanopesticides take on a variety of classifications based on chemical composition and their mode of action. Nano-encapsulated pesticides use nanocarriers such as polymers, liposomes, or metal-organic frameworks to carry active pesticides to plants, aiming for a slow and controlled release of these chemicals. One neem oil chitosan-based formulation has increased bioactivity of botanical pesticides. Nano-emulsions are classified as oil-in-water emulsions meant to improve solubility and stability, with a highlight being a nano-emulsified azadirachtin defending against insecticidal activity more than traditional pesticide formulations. Inorganic pesticides are known to show antimicrobial properties, with zinc oxide nanoparticles showing promise in fungicidal activity against mainstream plant pathogens.

Despite all the apparent benefits, there are no clear regulations set for nanopesticides, and there is debate as to how silver and copper nanoparticle accumulation in soil and water can affect insect, aquatic, and microbial communities.

=== Nanosensors ===
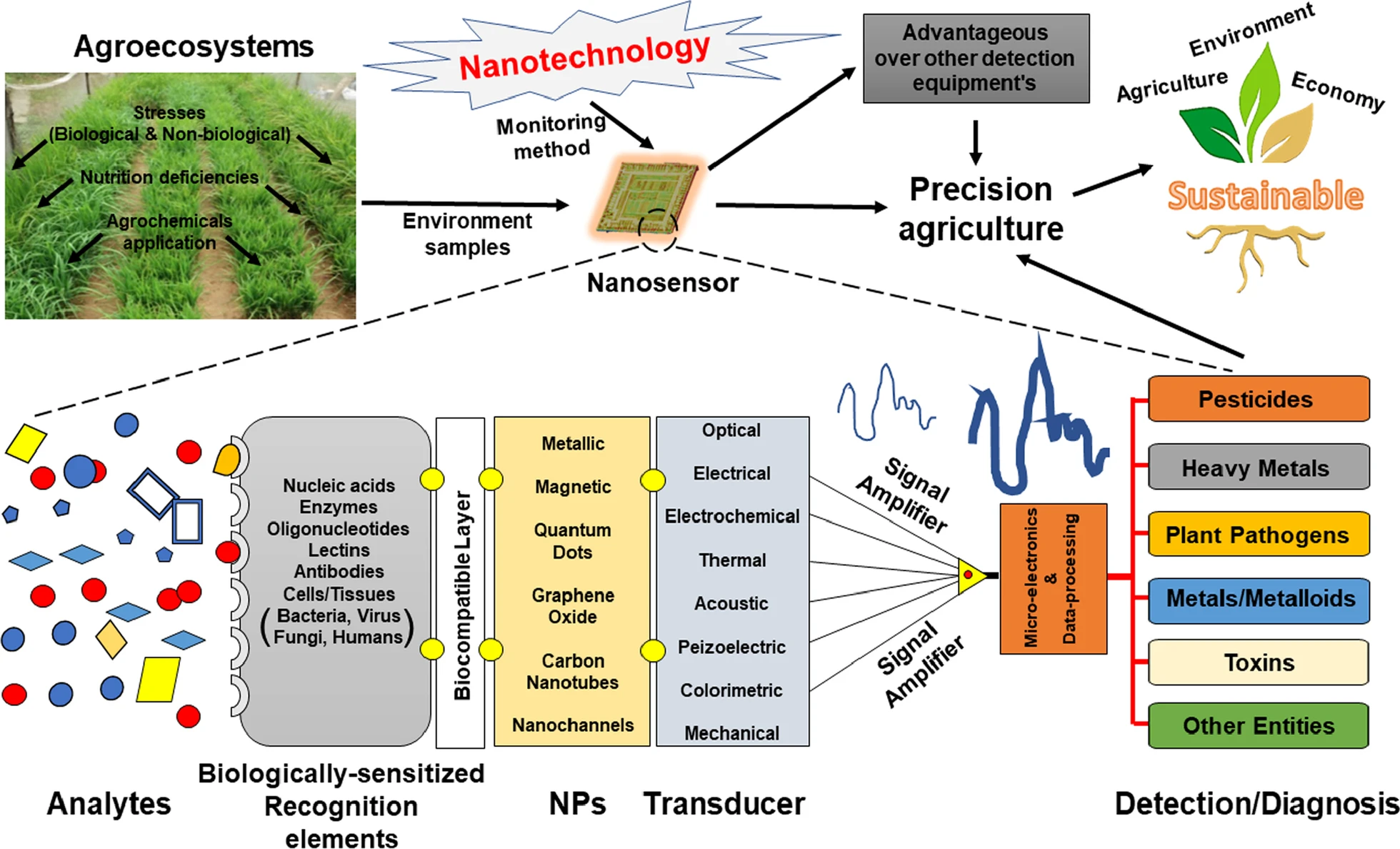
The past couple of decades have witnessed a great expansion of the science of nanotechnology and this development has largely facilitated the development of modest, quick, and economically viable bio and nanosensors for detecting different entities contaminating the natural agroecosystems with an advantage of being innocuous to human health. The growth of nanotechnology has offered rapid development of bio and nanosensors for the detection of several composites which range from several metal ions, proteins, pesticides, to the detection of complete microorganisms.

Nanosensors are new devices in precision agriculture, designed to monitor soil health, detect pathogens, optimize irrigation, and assess overall soil and plant conditions. They utilize nanomaterials to respond to environmental changes by detecting changes in nutrient levels, pH, and soil contaminants. Graphene-based nanosensors have been created to monitor nitrate and phosphate concentrations, electrochemical sensors can measure heavy metal contamination, aiding in land remediation, and zinc oxide sensors track nitrogen deficiency in soil. Other sensors have detected plant viruses and bacteria, such as tobacco mosaic virus, citrus tristeza virus, and Xylella fastidiosa, before symptoms appear.

A major concern in agricultural practices is water scarcity, and nanosensors hope to alleviate this by analyzing moisture levels in real-time. For example, Silicon-based nanosensors track water retention in soil, ensuring efficient irrigation and reducing water waste. Silver-based systems have detected nitrates and heavy metals in irrigation water, and hydrogel-embedded nanosensors are able to save water by adjusting release based on soil hydration levels. They have also been used to detect ethylene, allowing for precision harvesting, monitor photosynthesis rates, and track plant stress signals in droughts or nutrient deficiencies.

Nanosensors represent a significant advancement in the field of precision agriculture, and as the technology continues to evolve, they will play a vital role in enhancing productivity, although further research is needed to know the extent of long-term impacts on the ecosystem and farming practices. Recent work also highlights how nanosensors can assist in real-time monitoring of crops by tracking environmental and biological changes as they occur. These insights support timely responses during cultivation, helping farmers protect yields and manage resources more efficiently.

== Nanotechnology in plant transformations ==
Nanotechnology has played a pivotal role in the field of genetic engineering and plant transformations, making it a desirable candidate in the optimization and manipulation of cultivated plants. In the past, most genetic modifications to plants have been done with Agrobacterium, or utilising tools such as the gene gun (biolistics); however, these older methods of gene implementation face roadblocks due to low species compatibility lack of versatility/compatibility with Chloroplastial/Mitochondrial gene transformations, and potential for cell or organelle damage (due to impact of biolistics). While biolistics and Agrobacterium are useful in specific species of plants- more refined approaches are being explored through the utilisation of nanomaterials- allowing for a less invasive and forced delivery approach. These methods utilise Carbon Nanotube (CNT) and various porous nanoparticle (NP) enabled delivery methods, which may allow for higher-throughput plant transformation- while also circumventing legal GMO restrictions. The research of non-incorporative/DNA-Free genetic modifications has become a very important field of study, since traditional methods of plant transformation (agrobacterium and biolistics) risk DNA incorporation in the plant genome, thus making them transgenic and qualifying them as a GMO.

A novel strategy utilizes highly-tailorable diffusion based nanocarriers for the delivery of genetic material, allowing for non-transgenic, non-destructive plant transformation. The method specificity is highly dependent on the properties of the material utilized, with key factors including size, polarity, and surface chemistry. Some approaches to diffusion based delivery have used Nano-Structured-DNA, carbon nanotubes, and other nanoparticles as vesicles for the delivery of genetic information. . These methods typically rely on functionalization of the surface or manipulation of porosity of a nanocarrier in order to optimize the loading and delivery of genetic information. DNA nanostructures have been shown to be a highly programmable modality in terms of delivery of small interfering RNA (siRNA), exploring the optimal design parameters necessary for plant cell internalization. A recent study utilizing DNA loaded CNTs was able to successfully express desired traits in various mature model plant systems- and even isolated Eruca sativa protoplasts while managing to protect and maintain the fidelity of the transferred genetic material. Lastly, porous nanoparticles have been shown to be an effective DNA delivering agent for plant transformations- with efficiency depending on pore size and strand length. All in all, these diffusion based gene transformation methodologies offer a cheaper mode of plant gene transformation with lower impact to plant tissue, lower transformation efficiencies, and little to no risk of DNA incorporation.

Biolistics is the primary approach to plant transformation. The biolistic process involves launching microprojectiles (usually gold microparticles) carrying genetic information through the cell walls and membranes of cells to impart genetic transformation. As previously mentioned, biolistics may result in damaging the targeted cells or organelles- thus in order to minimize potential cell damage, nano-biolistic methods have been developed. Due to the significantly reduced size of the particle being launched into the cell, the impact can be minimized, while offering a similar efficiency of genetic transformation as traditional biolistics. However, most studies utilizing nanoscale biolistic approaches are done with animal cells, so implementation in plant transformation is still fairly novel and may encounter roadblocks unseen in animal cell studies.

Overall, nanotechnology provides a novel approach to genetic transformation of plants. Going forward, future research into the applications of these approaches will span a greater variety of crops, aim to utilize cheaper, more scalable methods, and explore potential environmental effects. Ultimately, these design criteria will determine whether nanomaterial plant transformations will become a widespread practice in the future of agriculture.

== Public opinion ==
=== Success with Nanotechnology ===
Some case studies celebrate the success of nanotechnology with its transformative potential to enhance farming practices, boost yields, reduce costs, and improve sustainability in certain regions of the world. In recent years, as applications of nanotechnology have exhibited promise in many fields of study, an increasing number of government, scientific, and independent institutional bodies have seen the potential of nanotechnology in making significant contributions to alleviating the burden of the global food supply. Current public views on nanotechnology development in the agricultural industry are mixed. With consideration of the potential hazards in conjunction with the potential benefits, the current public opinion appears to be relatively neutral as critics see the technology as less risky, and more beneficial than a number of other technologies such as pesticides and chemical disinfectants; however, it is perceived as riskier and less beneficial than solar technologies and vaccinations.

=== Environmental Impact ===
Despite potential publicized advantages for sustainability, the use of nanotechnology in agriculture raises concerns about environmental toxicity and bioaccumulation of particles in ecosystems. Among the general public, there still exists negative connotations related to fertilizers and genetic modification of living organisms. Concerns that despite the benefit of higher yields and shorter growing cycles, fertilizers are associated with toxic runoff that contaminate sources of water and can lead to the generation of acid rain. Additionally, there exists the unfounded fear that consumption of genetically modified foods is 'unnatural' and dangerous, which has led to numerous legislative efforts- limiting the field to non-transgenic transformations. While the majority of public fears and concerns are unfounded, it is more the result of poor communication and lack of public awareness related to the issue of introducing novel technology to a traditional industry such as agriculture. Ultimately the production of clean and healthy food is considered by many to be of high importance, simply due to the high frequency of consumption and intimate relation people have with the food they consume.

=== Ethical Concerns ===
Concerns have also been raised about equitable access, cultural compatibility, and socioeconomic disparities, particularly in developing regions and in places still utilizing traditional and Indigenous farming practices. Arguments have been made that nanotechnology disproportionately favors large businesses over smaller farmers, widening the gap between industrial and traditional farming communities. Accessibility concerns from the cost of nanotechnology products that could impact lower-income regions have also been raised. Skepticism has been raised from Indigenous and traditional farming communities, due to the uncertainties about long-term effects on soil, water, and the ecosystem. Addressing ethical considerations requires inclusive policymaking, transparent risk assessment, and equitable benefit distribution, preventing marginalization of certain agricultural communities.
