= Spiroligomer =

Class of chemical compounds

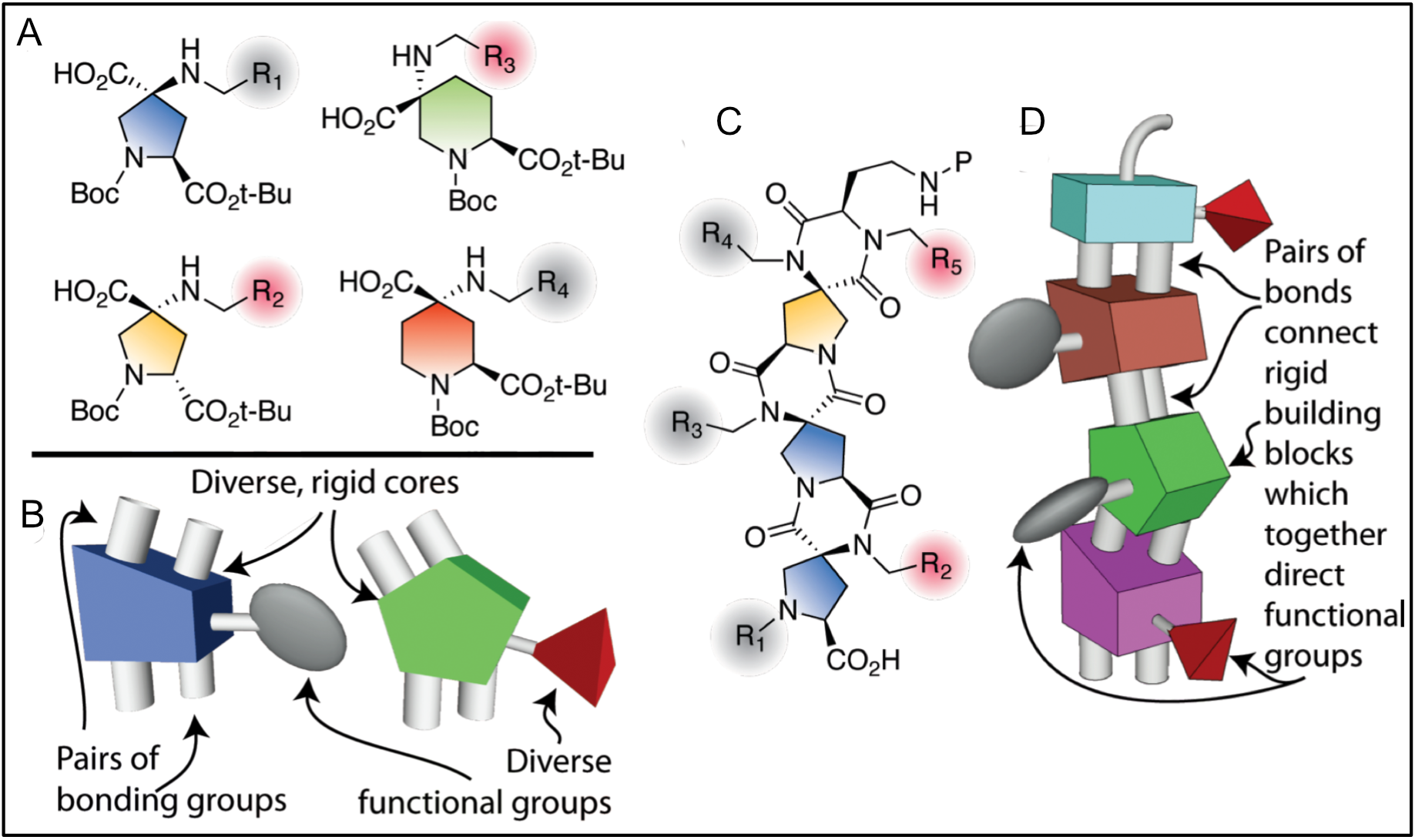
Spiroligomer Scaffolds - (A) bis-amino acids (B) 3D Mock up of a bis-amino acids (C) Spiroligomer Trimer (D) 3D Mock up of a Spiroligomer

Spiroligomer molecules (also known as bis-peptides) are synthetic oligomers made by coupling pairs of bis-amino acids into a fused ring system. Spiroligomer molecules are rich in stereochemistry and functionality because of the variety of bis-amino acids that are capable of being incorporated during synthesis. Due to the rigidity of the fused ring system, the three-dimensional shape of a Spiroligomer molecule – as well as the display of any functional groups – can be predicted, allowing for molecular modeling and dynamics.

== Synthesis ==
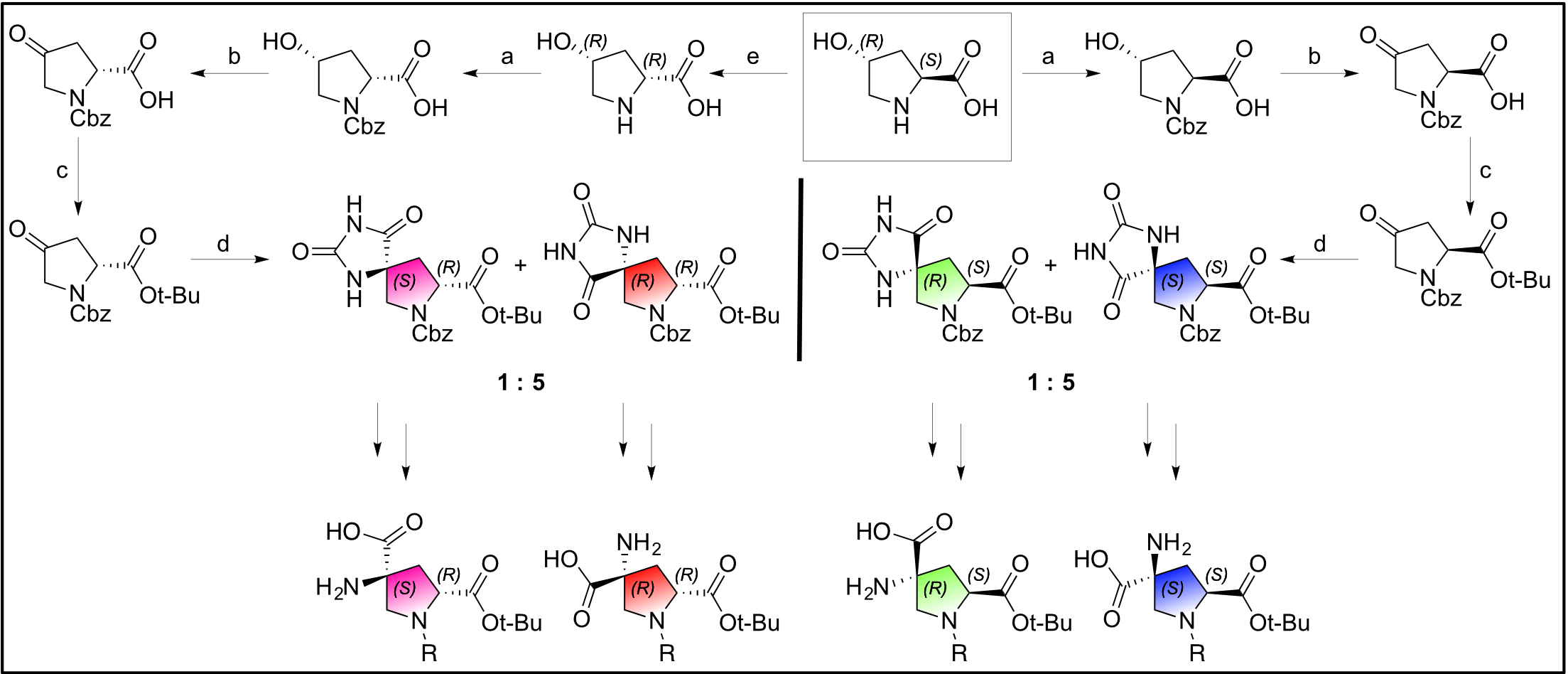
Synthesis of Spiroligomer building blocks (bis-amino acids). (a) Cbz-Cl, NaHCO3, 1:10 dioxane/water (b) Jones reagents, acetone, 0 oC to rt; (c) Isobutylene, H2SO4 (cat.), CH2Cl2, 0 oC to rt; (d) (NH4)2CO3, KCN, 1:1 EtOH/water, sealed tube; (e) (i) AcOH/Ac2O, Reflux; (ii) 2M HCl, reflux; (iii) Recrystallization

Spiroligomer molecules are synthesized in a step-wise approach by adding a single bis-amino acid at each stage of the synthesis. This stepwise elongation allows for complete control of the stereochemistry, as any bis-amino acid can be incorporated to allow for elongation; or any mono-amino acid can be added to terminate a chain. This can be accomplished using either solution-phase or solid-phase reactions. The original synthesis of Spiroligomer molecule allowed for functionalization on the ends of the oligomers, but it did not allow for the incorporation of functionality on the interior diketopiperazine (DKP) nitrogens. Much work has been done to allow for the functionalization of the entire Spiroligomer molecule, as opposed to just the ends. By exploiting a neighboring group effect, Spiroligomer molecule can be synthesized with a variety of functional groups along the length of the molecule.

== Structure ==
Spiroligomer molecules can be synthesized in any direction, and between any pair of bis-amino acids. Spiroligomer diketopiperazines can be created between either end of a bis-amino acid. Spiroligomer molecules are known to be conformationally rigid, due to the fused-ring backbone.

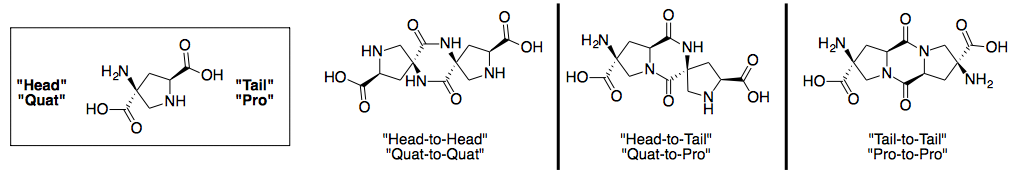
Shown are three common ways of connecting Spiroligomer molecules through pairs of amide bonds (diketopiperazines, DKPs)

== Chemical characteristics ==
Spiroligomer molecules are peptidomimetics, completely resistant to proteases, and not likely to raise an immune response.

== Uses ==
Spiroligomer molecules have been utilized for a variety of applications which include catalysis, protein binding, metal-binding, molecular scaffolds, and charge-transfer studies, et al.

=== Catalysis ===
Two unique types of Spiroligomer catalysts (spiroligozymes) have been developed, an esterase mimic and a Claisen catalyst.

==== Transesterification ====
The first Spiroligomer catalyst was an esterase-mimic, which catalyzed the transfer of a trifluoroacetate group.

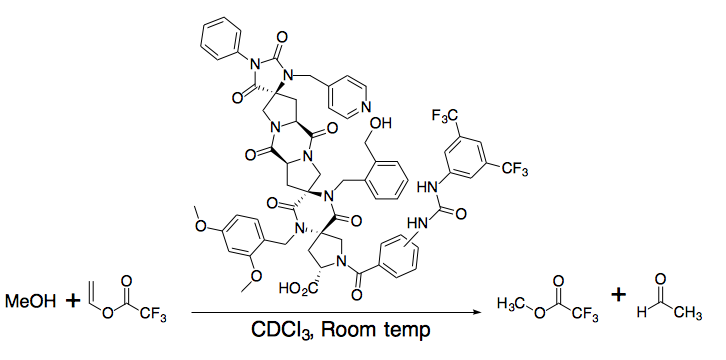
Transesterification of vinyl-trifluoroacetate with a Spiroligozyme

==== Aromatic Claisen rearrangement ====
The second Spiroligomer catalyst accelerated an aromatic Claisen rearrangement with a catalytic dyad similar to that found in ketosteroid isomerase.

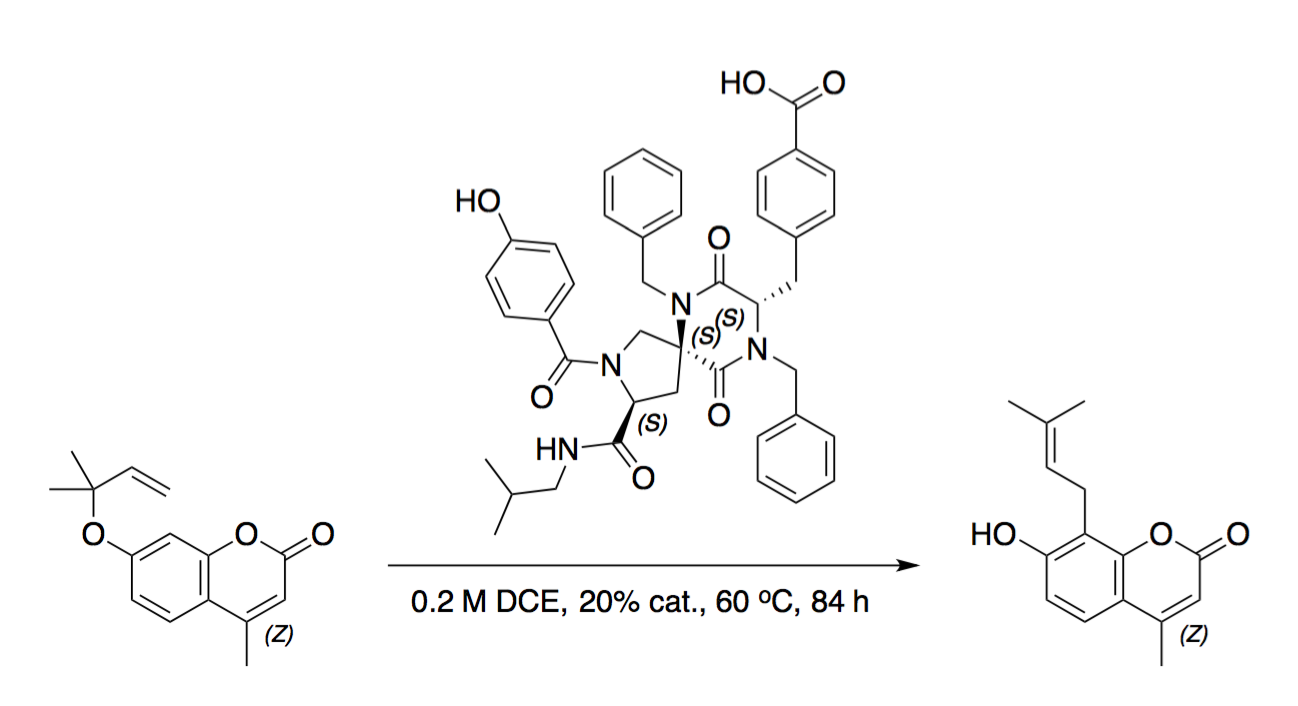
Aromatic Claisen Rearrangement with a Spiroligozyme

=== Protein binding ===
A Spiroligomer peptidomimetic was designed to mimic P53 and bind HDM2. The molecule enters cells through passive diffusion, and this mimic was shown to stabilize HDM2 in cell culture.

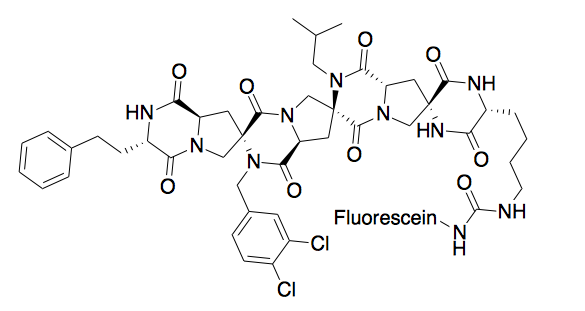
Chemdraw of a Spiroligomer that penetrates cells and binds HDM2

=== Metal binding ===
Binuclear metal binding

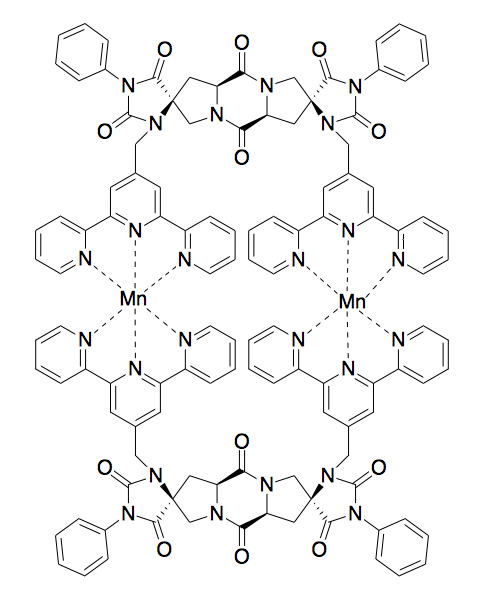
A Spiroligomer that binds manganese and zinc

=== Molecular scaffolds ===
Rods used for distance measuring with spin probes.

=== Electron transfer ===
Donor-Bridge-Acceptor

=== Other uses ===
Possible applications that are currently investigated include the binding and inactivation of cholera toxin and the cross linkage of surface proteins of various viruses (HIV, Ebola virus). Further the group of Christian Schafmeister developed molecular hinges, which can be used for the construction of molecular machines, such as nano-valves or data storage systems.

== See also ==
- Molecular engineering
- Molecular machine
- Molecular nanotechnology
- Nanotechnology
