= Ion implantation-induced nanoparticle formation =

Technique for creating nanometer-sized particles

Ion implantation-induced nanoparticle formation is a technique for creating nanometer-sized particles for use in electronics.

== Ion implantation ==
Ion Implantation is a technique extensively used in the field of materials science for material modification. The effect it has on nanomaterials allows manipulation of mechanical, electronic, morphological, and optical properties.

One-dimensional nano-materials are an important contributor to the creation of nano-devices such as field effect transistors, nanogenerators and solar cells. The offer the potential of high integration density, lower power consumption, higher speed and super high frequency.

The effects of ion implantation varies according to multiple variables. Collision cascade may occur during implantation and this causes of interstitials and vacancies in target materials (although these defects may be mitigated through dynamic annealing). Collision modes are nuclear collision, electron collision and charge exchange. Another process is the sputtering effect, which significantly affects the morphology and shape of nano-materials.
