= Glossary of nanotechnology =

This glossary of nanotechnology is a list of definitions of terms and concepts relevant to nanotechnology, its sub-disciplines, and related fields.

For more inclusive glossaries concerning related fields of science and technology, see Glossary of chemistry terms, Glossary of physics, Glossary of biology, and Glossary of engineering.

== A ==
Adenosine Triphosphate (ATP)
A chemical compound that functions as fuel for biomolecular nanotechnology.
Animat
Assembler
A molecular manufacturing device capable of positioning molecules through chemical reactions.
Atom
The smallest unit of a chemical element, about a third of a nanometer in diameter.
Atomic force microscope (AFM)
An imaging instrument used to “magnify” at the molecular level through mechanical tracing of surface contours.
Automated engineering
Engineering done by computer systems without the input of humans.
Automated manufacturing
Manufacturing at the nano-level by assemblers & Replicators by themselves.
Atomic layer deposition (ALD)
A technique developed in the 1970s for depositing monolayers of material in a sequential, controlled manner using self-limiting reactions. It is used to make thin films.
Atomic Manipulation
Manipulating atoms, typically with the tip of an STM.
Atomistic Simultations
Atomic motion computer simulations of macromolecular systems are increasingly becoming an essential part of materials science and nanotechnology.

== B ==
Ballistic Magnetoresistance (BMR)
A way in which spin orientation, encoding information on a storage medium such as a hard drive, can modify electrical resistance in a nearby circuit, thereby accomplishing the sensing of that orientation.
Bio-assemblies
Containing several protein units, DNA loops, lipids, various ligands, etc.
Biovorous
An organism capable of converting biological material into energy for sustenance.
Biochauvinism
The prejudice that biological systems have an intrinsic superiority that will always give them a monopoly on self-reproduction and intelligence.
Biomedical Nanotechnology
BioMEMS
MEMS used in medicine, that use microchips.
BioNEMS
Biofunctionalized nanoelectromechanical systems.
Biomimetics
Study of the structure and function of biological substances to make artificial products that mimic the natural ones.
Biomimetic Chemistry
Knowledge of biochemistry, analytical chemistry, polymer science, and biomimetic chemistry is linked and applied to research in designing new molecules, molecular assemblies, and macromolecules having biomimetic functions.
Biomimetic Materials
Materials that imitate, copy, or learn from nature.
Biopolymeroptoelectromechanical Systems (BioPOEMS)
Combining optics and microelectromechanical systems, and used in biological applications.
Biostasis
A condition in which an organism's cell and tissue structure are preserved, allowing later restoration by cell repair machines.
Blue goo
Slang term for nanobots designed to protect against harmful nanotechnology; "blue" being a metonym for police as in the color of many police uniforms.
Bose-Einstein Condensate (BEC)
A state of matter (also called the fifth state of matter) which is typically formed when a gas of bosons at low densities is cooled to temperatures very close to absolute zero.
Bottom Up
Building larger objects from smaller building blocks. Nanotechnology seeks to use atoms and molecules as those building blocks.
Brownian Assembly
Brownian motion in a fluid brings molecules together in various position and orientations.
Brownian Motion
Motion of a particle in a fluid owing to thermal agitation, observed in 1827 by Robert Brown.
Bulk technology
Technology in which atoms and molecular are manipulated in bulk, rather than individually.
Buckminsterfullerene
A broad term covering the variety of buckyballs and carbon nanotubes that exist.
Bucky Balls
Molecules made up of 60 carbon atoms arranged in a series of interlocking hexagonal shapes, forming a structure similar to a soccer ball.
Bush robot
A concept for robots of ultimate dexterity, they utilize fractal branching to create ever-shrinking "branches," eventually ending in nanoscale "fingers."

== C ==
Carbon Nanotubes
Cellular Automata
an array of identically programmed automata, or "cells," which interact with one another.
Cell pharmacology
Delivery of drugs by medical nanomachines to exact locations in the body.
Cell Repair Machine
Molecular and nanoscale machines with sensors, nanocomputers and tools, programmed to detect and repair damage to cells and tissues, which could even report back to and receive instructions from a human doctor if needed.
Chemical Vapour Deposition (CVD)
A technique used to deposit coatings, where chemicals are first vaporized, and then applied using an inert carrier gas such as nitrogen.
Cobots
Collaborative robots designed to work alongside human operators.
Cognotechnology
Convergence of nanotech, biotech and IT, for remote brain sensing and mind control.
Computational Nanotechnology
Permits the modeling and simulation of complex nanometer-scale structures.
Computronium
A highly (or optimally) efficient matrix for computation, such as dense lattices of nanocomputers or quantum dot cellular automata.
Contelligence
The combination of awareness and computational power required in an Artificially Intelligent network before we could, without loss of anything essential, upload ourselves into them.
Convergent Assembly
It is based on the idea that smaller parts can be assembled into larger parts, larger parts can be assembled into still larger parts, and so forth.

== D ==
Dendrimers
A tiny molecular structure that interacts with cells, enabling scientists to probe, diagnose, cure or manipulate them on a nanoscale.
Diamondoid
Structures that resemble diamond in a broad sense, strong stiff structures containing dense, three dimensional networks of covalent bonds, formed chiefly from first and second row atoms with a valence of three or more.
Dip Pen Nanolithography
An AFM-based soft-lithography technique.
Directed-Assembler
A specific type of assembler that makes use of directed-assembly, such that the assembly process requires external energy or information input.
Disassemble
An instrument able to take apart structures a few atoms at a time, recording structural information at each step.
DNA Chip
A purpose built microchip used to identify mutations or alterations in a gene's DNA.
Dopeyballs
Superconducting Buckyballs (they) have the highest critical temperature of any known organic compound.
Dry Nanotechnology
Derives from surface science and physical chemistry, focuses on fabrication of structures in carbon (e.g. fullerenes and nanotubes), silicon, and other inorganic materials.

== E ==
Ecophagy
Consuming the biological environment.
Ecosystem protector
A nanomachine for mechanically removing selected imported species from an ecosystem to protect native species.
Enabling science and technologies
Areas of research relevant to a particular goal, such as nanotechnology.
Entanglement
From quantum mechanics, entanglement is a relationship between two objects in which they both exhibit superposition but once the state of one object is measured, the state of the other is also known.
Exponential assembly
A manufacturing architecture starting with a single tiny robotic arm on a surface.
Exponential Growth
Exponential growth refers to the process of growth or replication involving doubling within a given period.

== F ==
Femtometer
A unit suitable to express the size of atomic nuclei.
Femtosecond
One quadrillionth of a second, and is to a second what a second is to 32,700,000 years.
Femtotechnology
The art of manipulating materials on the scale of elementary particles (leptons, hadrons, and quarks).
Fluidic Self Assembly
A novel technique for accurately assembling large numbers of very small devices.
Foglet
A mesoscale machine.
Fractal
A mathematical construct that has a fractional dimension.
Fractal Mechatronic Universal Assembler
A machine that is capable of assembling any chemical from a generic descriptions of the properties required of the chemical.
Fractal Robots
Programmable machines that can do unlimited tasks in the physical world, the world of matter.
Fullerenes
A molecular form of pure carbon discovered in 1985.

== G ==
Genegeneering
Genetic engineering.
GENIE
An AI combined with an assembler or other universal constructor, programmed to build anything the owner wishes. Sometimes called a Santa Machine.
Golden goo
Hypothetical scenario in which nanomachines programmed to filter gold from seawater go out of control and produce endless piles of gold goo.
GNR technologies
Genetic Engineering, Nanotechnology, and Robotics.
Grey goo
Hypothetical global catastrophic scenario involving molecular nanotechnology in which out-of-control self-replicating machines consume all biomass on Earth while building more of themselves.
Green goo
Hypothetical use of nanomachines or bio-engineered organisms used for population control of humans, either by governments or eco-terrorist groups.
Guy Fawkes scenario
Hypothetical scenario in which wide availability of nanotech makes it trivial for anyone to produce significant amounts of explosives for use in committing acts of terrorism.

== H ==
Heteronuclear
Consisting of different elements.

== I ==
Immune Machines
Medical nanomachines designed for internal use, especially in the bloodstream and digestive tract, able to identify and disable intruders such as bacteria and viruses.
IMP
Electronic implant, especially in the brain.
Inline Universities
Nanocomputer implants serving to increase intelligence and education of their owners, essentially turning them into walking universities.

== K ==
Khaki goo
Slang term for hypothetical military use of nanotechnology, especially as of weaponized grey goo.
Knowbots
Knowledge robots, first developed Vinton G. Cref and Robert E. Kahn for National Research Initiatives.

== L ==
Langmuir-Blodgett
The name of a nanofabrication technique used to create ultrathin films (monolayers and isolated molecular layers), the end result of which is called a "Langmuir-Blodgett film."
LCD
The predominant technology used in flat panel displays.
LED
OLED
Limited Assembler
Assembler capable of making only certain products; faster, more efficient, and less liable to abuse than a general-purpose assembler.

== M ==
Mechanochemistry
The direct, mechanical control of molecular structure formation and manipulation to form atomically precise products.
Mechanosynthesis
Molecular tools with chemically specific tip structures can be used, sequentially, to modify a work piece and build a wide range of molecular structures.
Microelectromechanical systems (MEMS)
Generic term to describe micron scale electrical/mechanical devices.
Mesoscale
A device or structure larger than the nanoscale (10^-9 m) and smaller than the megascale.
Microencapsulation
Individually encapsulated small particles.
Molecular assembler
Also known as an assembler, a molecular assembler is a molecular machine that can build a molecular structure from its component building blocks.
Molecular Beam Epitaxy
Process used to make compound (multi-layer) semiconductors.
Molecular Integrated Microsystems (MIMS)
Microsystems in which functions found in biological and nanoscale systems are combined with manufacturable materials.
Molecular Electronics (ME)
Any system with atomically precise electronic devices of nanometer dimensions, especially if made of discrete molecular parts rather than the continuous materials found in today's semiconductor devices.
Molecular Manipulator
A device combining a proximal probe mechanism for atomically precise positioning with a molecule binding site on the tip; can serve as the basis for building complex structures by positional synthesis.
Molecular Manufacturing
Manufacturing using molecular machinery, giving molecule-by-molecule control of products and by-products via positional chemical synthesis.
Molecular Medicine
Studying molecules as they relate to health and disease, and manipulating those molecules to improve the diagnosis, prevention, and treatment of disease.
Molecular Nanogenerator
Molecular Nanotechnology (MNT)
Thorough, inexpensive control of the structure of matter based on molecule-by-molecule control of products and byproducts; the products and processes of molecular manufacturing, including molecular machinery.
Molecular Recognition
A chemical term referring to processes in which molecules adhere in a highly specific way, forming a larger structure; an enabling technology for nanotechnology.
Molecular Systems Engineering
Design, analysis, and construction of systems of molecular parts working together to carry out a useful purpose.
Molecular Wire
A molecular wire - the simplest electronic component - is a quasi-one-dimensional molecule that can transport charge carriers (electrons or holes) between its ends.
MOLMAC
Molecular machine.
Monomer
The units from which a polymer is constructed.
Monomolecular Computing
The implantation inside a single molecule of all the functional groups or circuits to realize a calculation, without any help from external artifices such as re-configuration, calculation sharing between the user and the machine, or selection of the operational devices.
Moore's Law
It stated at the time that the number of transistors packed into an integrated circuit had doubled every year since the technology's inception four years earlier.

== N ==
Nanarchist
Someone who circumvents government control to use nanotechnology, or someone who advocates this.
Nanarchy
The use of automatic law-enforcement by nanomachines or robots, without any human control.
Nanoarray
An ultra-sensitive, ultra-miniaturized array for biomolecular analysis.
Nanoassembler
Nanobalance
A nanoscale balance for determining mass, small enough to weigh viruses and other sub-micron scale particles.
Nanobeads
Polymer beads with diameters of between 0.1 to 10 micrometers.
Nanobialys
Miniature bialy-shaped particles developed by Washington University as delivery agents for drugs and imaging agents directly to the sites of tumors and plaques.
Nanobiotechnology
Applying the tools and processes of MNT to build devices for studying biosystems, in order to learn from biology how to create better nanoscale devices.
Nanobot
Nanobubbles
Tiny air bubbles on colloid surfaces.
Nanocatalysis
Nanochips
Nanochondria
Nanomachines existing inside living cells, participating in their biochemistry (like mitochondria) and/or assembling various structures.
Nanocombinatorics
The new analytical method utilizes a technique invented at Northwestern called polymer pen lithography, where basically a rubber stamp having as many as 11 million sharp pyramids is mounted on a transparent glass backing and precisely controlled by an atomic force microscope to generate desired patterns on a surface.
Nanocomputer
A computer made from components (mechanical, electronic, or otherwise) built at the nanometer scale.
Nanocontainers
Nanoscale polymeric containers that could be used to selectively deliver hydrophobic drugs to specific sites within individual cells.
Nanocrystals
Aggregates of anywhere from a few hundred to tens of thousands of atoms that combine into a crystalline form of matter known as a "cluster."
Nanodefenses
Any of the "good" goos, such a blue goo; protectors against grey goo, destructive nanoswarms, and the like.
Nanodisaster
Various so-called "goo" scenarios that have potentially negative outcomes.
NEMSA
A generic term to describe nano scale electrical/mechanical devices.
Nanoelectronics
Electronics on a nanometer scale, whether made by current techniques or nanotechnology; includes both molecular electronics and nanoscale devices resembling today's semiconductor devices.
Nanofabrication
Construction of items using assemblers and stock molecules.
Nanofacture
The fabrication of goods using nanotechnology.
Nanofilters
One opportunity for nanoscale filters is for the separation of molecules, such as proteins or DNA, for research in genomics.
Nanofluidics
Controlling nano-scale amounts of fluids.
Nanogate
A device that precisely meters the flow of tiny amounts of fluid.
Nanohorns
One of the SWNT (single walled carbon nanotube) types, with an irregular horn-like shape, which may be a critical component of a new generation of fuel cells.
Nanoimprinting
A technique that is very simple in concept, and totally analogous to traditional mould- or form-based printing technology, but that uses moulds (masters) with nanoscale features.
Nanoimprint Machine
A form of soft lithography.
Nanohacking
"Hacking" at the molecular level.
Nanoindentation
Similar to conventional hardness testing performed on a much smaller scale.
Nanolithography
Writing on the nanoscale.
Nanomachine
An artificial molecular machine of the sort made by molecular manufacturing.
Nanomachining
Like traditional machining, where portions of the structure are removed or modified, nanomachining involves changing the structure of nano-scale materials or molecules.
nanoManipulator
Uses virtual reality (VR) goggles and a force feedback probe as an interface to a scanning probe microscope, providing researchers with a new way to interact with the atomic world.
Nanomanipulation
The process of manipulating items at an atomic or molecular scale in order to produce precise structures.
Nanomanufacturing
Nanomaterials
Can be subdivided into nanoparticles, nanofilms and nanocomposites.
Nanomedicine
Nano-Optics
Interaction of light and matter on the nanoscale.
Nanopens & Nanopencils
Allows for drawing electronic circuits a thousand times smaller than current ones.
NanoPGM
Nanopharmaceuticals
Nanoscale particles used to modulate drug transport for drug uptake and delivery applications.
Nanophase Carbon Materials
A form of matter in which small clusters of atoms form the building blocks of a larger structure.
Nanoplotter
A multi-tip nanopen.
Nanopores
Involves squeezing a DNA sequence between two oppositely charged fluid reservoirs, separated by an extremely small channel.
Nanoprobe
Nanoscale machines used to diagnose, image, report on, and treat disease within the body.

== P ==
Picotechnology
The art of manipulating materials on a quantum scale.
POSS Nanotechnology
POSS nanomaterials are attractive for missile and satellite launch rocket applications because they offer effective protection from collisions with space debris and the extreme thermal environments of deep space and atmospheric re-entry.
Polysilicon
Used in the manufacture of computer chips.
Positional Controlled Chemical Synthesis
Control of chemical reactions by precisely positioning the reactive molecules, the basic principle of assemblers.
Positional Assembly
Constructing materials an atom or molecule at a time.
Protein Design
The design and construction of new proteins; an enabling technology for nanotechnology.
Protein folding
The process by which proteins acquire their functional, preordained, three-dimensional structure after they emerge, as linear polymers of amino acids, from the ribosome.
Proteomics
The term proteome refers to all the proteins expressed by a genome, and thus proteomics involves the identification of proteins in the body and the determination of their role in physiological and pathophysiological functions.

== Q ==
Quantum Computer
A computer that takes advantage of quantum mechanical properties such as superposition and entanglement resulting from nanoscale, molecular, atomic and subatomic components.
Quantum Confined Atoms (QCA)
Atoms caged inside nanocrystals.
Quantum Cryptography
A system based on quantum- mechanical principles.
Quantum Dots
Nanometer-sized semiconductor crystals, or electrostatically confined electrons.
Quantum Dot Nanocrystal (QDN)
Used to tag biological molecules, and "measuring between five and ten nanometres across, are made up of three components.
Quantum Mechanics
A largely computational physical theory explaining the behavior of quantum phenomena, which incorporates the theory of special relativity. Despite dilignet attempts, general relativity has not been successfully incorporated into quantum mechanics.
Quantum Mirage
A nanoscale property that may allow information to be transferred through use of the wave property of electrons.
Quantum Tunneling
When electrons pass through a barrier, without overcoming it or breaking it down.
Quantum well
A P-N-P junction in which the "N" layer is ~10 nm (where traditional physics leaves off and quantum effects take over) and an "electron trap" is created.
Quantum wire
Another form of quantum dot, but unlike the single-dimension "dot," a quantum wire is confined only in two dimensions.
Qubit
The quantum computing analog to a bit.

== R ==
Red goo
Nanotechnology which is deliberately designed and released to cause harm, as opposed to a grey goo scenario which is assumed to be accidental.
Replicator
A system able to build copies of itself when provided with raw materials and energy.
Rheology
The study of the deformation and flow of matter under the influence of an applied stress, which might be, for example, a shear stress or extensional stress.

== S ==
SAMFET
Where a few molecules act as FETs, exhibiting both very strong gain, and extraordinarily rapid response.
Scanning Capacitance Microscopy
A method for mapping the local capacitance of a surface.
Scanning Force Microscope (SFM)
An instrument able to image surfaces to molecular accuracy by mechanically probing their surface contours.
Scanning Near Field Optical Microscopy
A method for observing local optical properties of a surface that can be smaller than the wavelength of the light used.
Scanning Thermal Microscopy
A method for observing local temperatures and temperature gradients on a surface.
Scanning Tunneling Microscope (STM)
An instrument able to image conducting surfaces to atomic accuracy; has been used to pin molecules to a surface.
Sealed Assembler Laboratory
A work space, containing assemblers, encapsulated in a way that allows information to flow in and out but does not allow the escape of assemblers or their products.
Self-assembly
In chemical solutions, self-assembly (also called Brownian assembly) results from the random motion of molecules and the affinity of their binding sites for one another.
Self-repair
Indicating ability to heal itself without outside intervention.
Self-replication
More accurately labeled "exponential replication," self-replication refers to the process of growth or replication involving doubling within a given period.
Single-walled carbon nanotubes (SWNT)
Shape Memory Alloy
A unique class of alloys which are able to "remember" their shape and are able to return to that shape even after being bent.
Smartdust
Tiny, bottle-cap-shaped micro-machines fitted with wireless communication devices - that measure light and temperature.
Smart material
Materials and products capable of relatively complex behavior due to the incorporation of nanocomputers and nanomachines.
Spintronics
Electronic devices that exploit the spin of electrons as well as their charge.
Superconductor
An object or substance that conducts electricity with zero resistance.
Superlattice Nanowire Pattern
A technique for producing "Ultra High Density Nanowire Lattices and Circuits". See Researchers Discover How to Make the Smallest, Most Perfect, Densest Nanowire Lattices-And It's a SNAP
Superposition
A quantum mechanical phenomena in which an object exists in more than one state simultaneously.
Superlattice Nanowire
Interwoven bundles of nanowires using substances with different compositions and properties.

== T ==
Technocyte
A nanoscale artificial device (especially a nanite) in the human bloodstream used for repairs, cancer protection, as an artificial immune system or for other uses.
Top Down Molding
Carving and fabricating small materials and components by using larger objects such as our hands, tools and lasers.
Transistor
The basic element in an integrated circuit.

== U ==
Universal Assembler
Uses raw atoms and molecules to construct consumer goods, and is pollution free.
Universal Constructor
A machine capable of constructing anything that can be constructed.
Utility fog
Objects formed of "intelligent" polymorphic (able to change shape) substances, typically having an octet truss structure.

== V ==
Vasculoid
A single, complex, multisegmented nanotechnological medical robotic system capable of duplicating all essential thermal and biochemical transport functions of the blood, including circulation of respiratory gases, glucose, hormones, cytokines, waste products, and cellular components.
Von Neumann Machine
A machine which is able to build a working copy of itself using materials in its environment.
Von Neumann Probe
A von Neumann Machine able to move over interstellar or interplanetary distances and to utilize local materials to build new copies of itself.

== W ==
Wet nanotechnology
The study of biological systems that exist primarily in a water environment.

== Z ==
Zeptosecond
One-billion-trillionth of a second.
Zettatechnology
Referring to the typical number of distinct designed parts in a product made by the systems we envision (molecular, mature, or molecular-manufacturing-based nanotechnology).

== See also ==
- Outline of nanotechnology
- Glossary of physics
- Glossary of areas of mathematics
- Glossary of astronomy
- Glossary of biology
- Glossary of calculus
- Glossary of chemistry terms
- Glossary of engineering
- Glossary of probability and statistics
