= Mesoscale =

Mesoscale may refer to:

- Mesoscale meteorology
- Mesoscopic scale in physics
- Mesoscale manufacturing
- Mesoscale eddies
