= The Law of Accelerating Returns =

Accelerating change proposed by Ray Kurzweil

The Law of Accelerating Returns is a type of accelerating change proposed by Ray Kurzweil in his 1999 book The Age of Spiritual Machines. According to it, the rate of change in a wide variety of evolutionary systems (including but not limited to the growth of technologies) tends to increase exponentially.

== Concept ==
In his 1999 book The Age of Spiritual Machines, Ray Kurzweil proposed The Law of Accelerating Returns, according to which the rate of change in a wide variety of evolutionary systems (including but not limited to the growth of technologies) tends to increase exponentially. He gave further focus to this issue in a 2001 essay entitled "The Law of Accelerating Returns". In it, Kurzweil argued for extending Moore's Law to describe exponential growth of diverse forms of technological progress. Whenever a technology approaches some kind of a barrier, according to Kurzweil, a new technology will be invented to allow us to cross that barrier. He cites numerous past examples of this to substantiate his assertions. He predicts that such paradigm shifts have and will continue to become increasingly common, leading to "technological change so rapid and profound it represents a rupture in the fabric of human history". He believes The Law of Accelerating Returns implies that a technological singularity will occur before the end of the 21st century, around 2045. The essay begins:

An analysis of the history of technology shows that technological change is exponential, contrary to the common-sense 'intuitive linear' view. So we won't experience 100 years of progress in the 21st century—it will be more like 20,000 years of progress (at today's rate). The 'returns,' such as chip speed and cost-effectiveness, also increase exponentially. There's even exponential growth in the rate of exponential growth. Within a few decades, machine intelligence will surpass human intelligence, leading to the Singularity—technological change so rapid and profound it represents a rupture in the fabric of human history. The implications include the merger of biological and nonbiological intelligence, immortal software-based humans, and ultra-high levels of intelligence that expand outward in the universe at the speed of light.

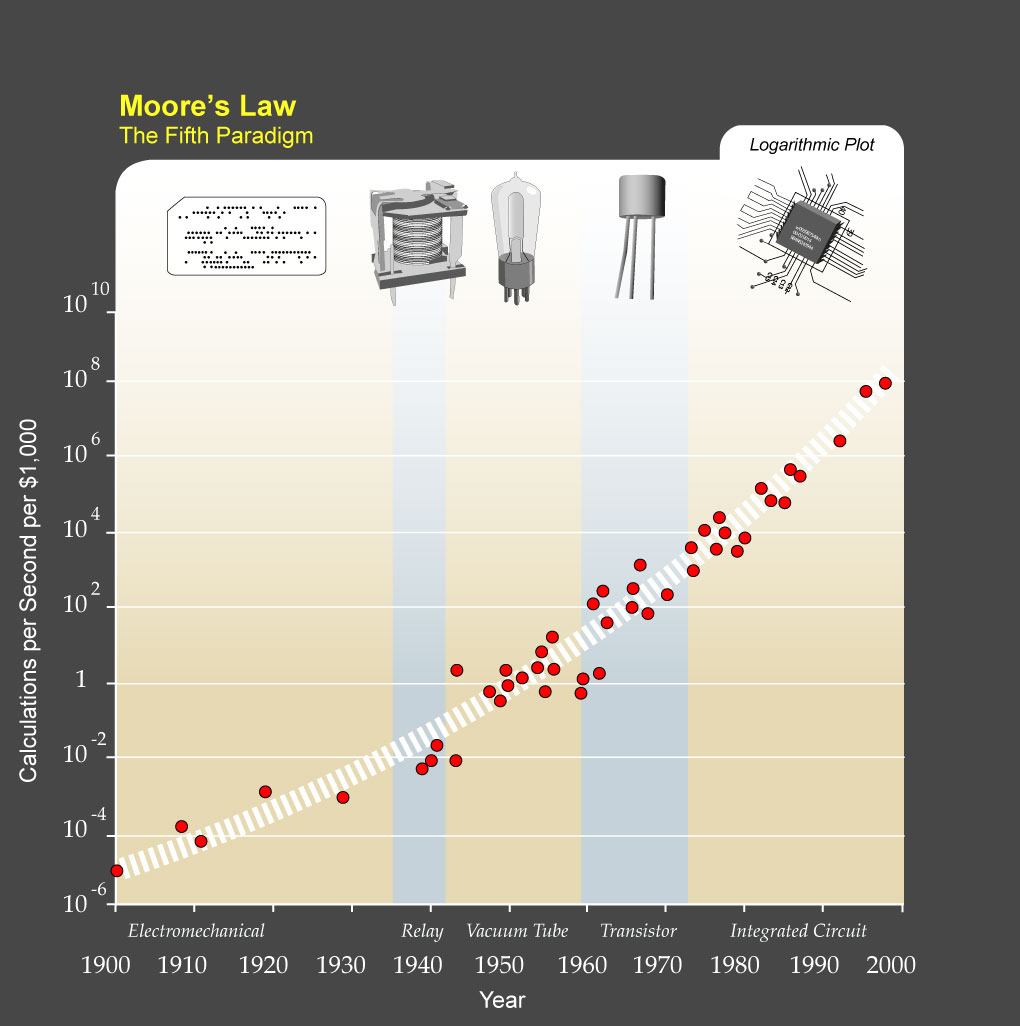
Moore's Law expanded to other technologies

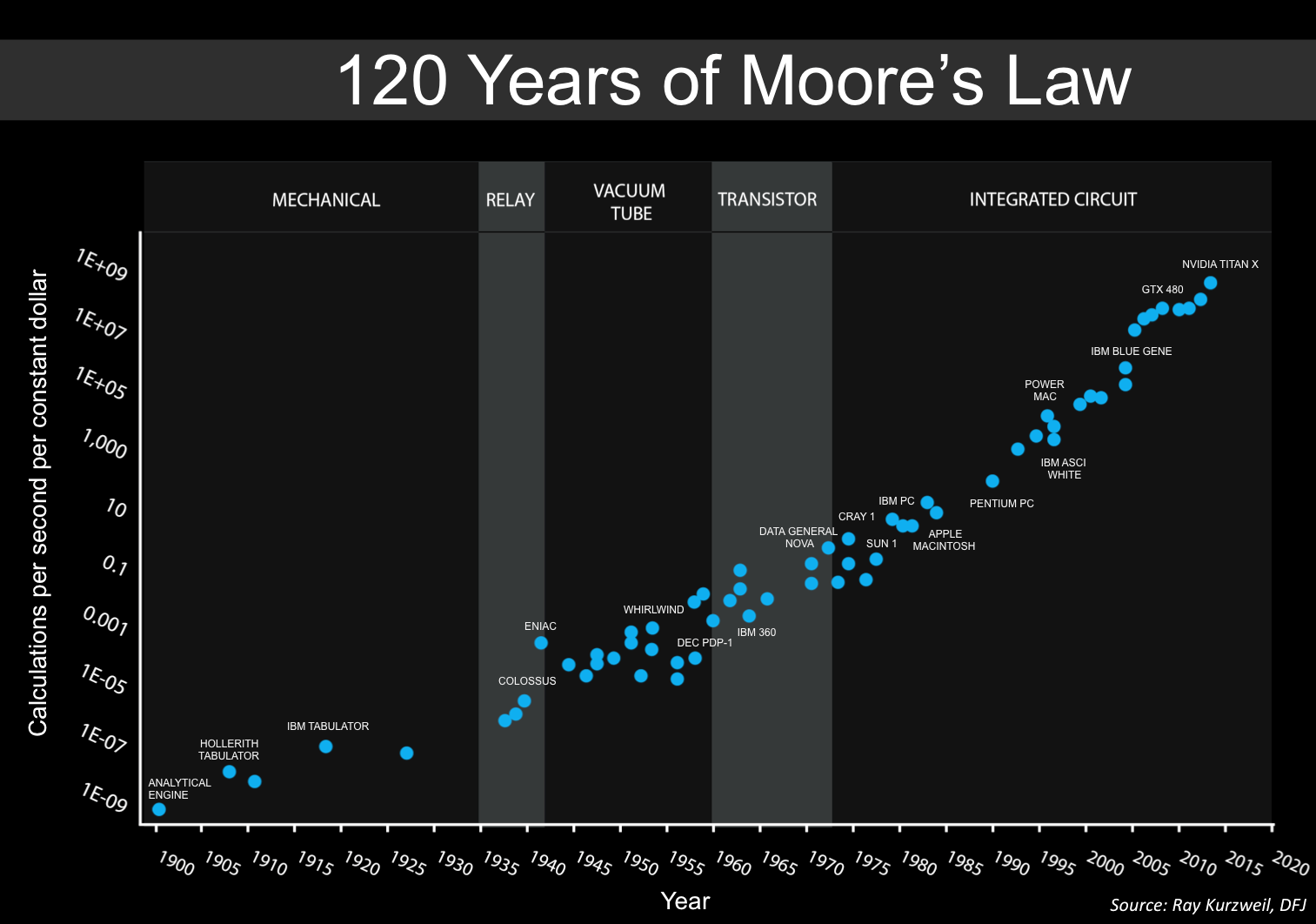
An updated version of Moore's Law over 120 years (based on Kurzweil's graph). The seven most recent data points are all Nvidia GPUs.

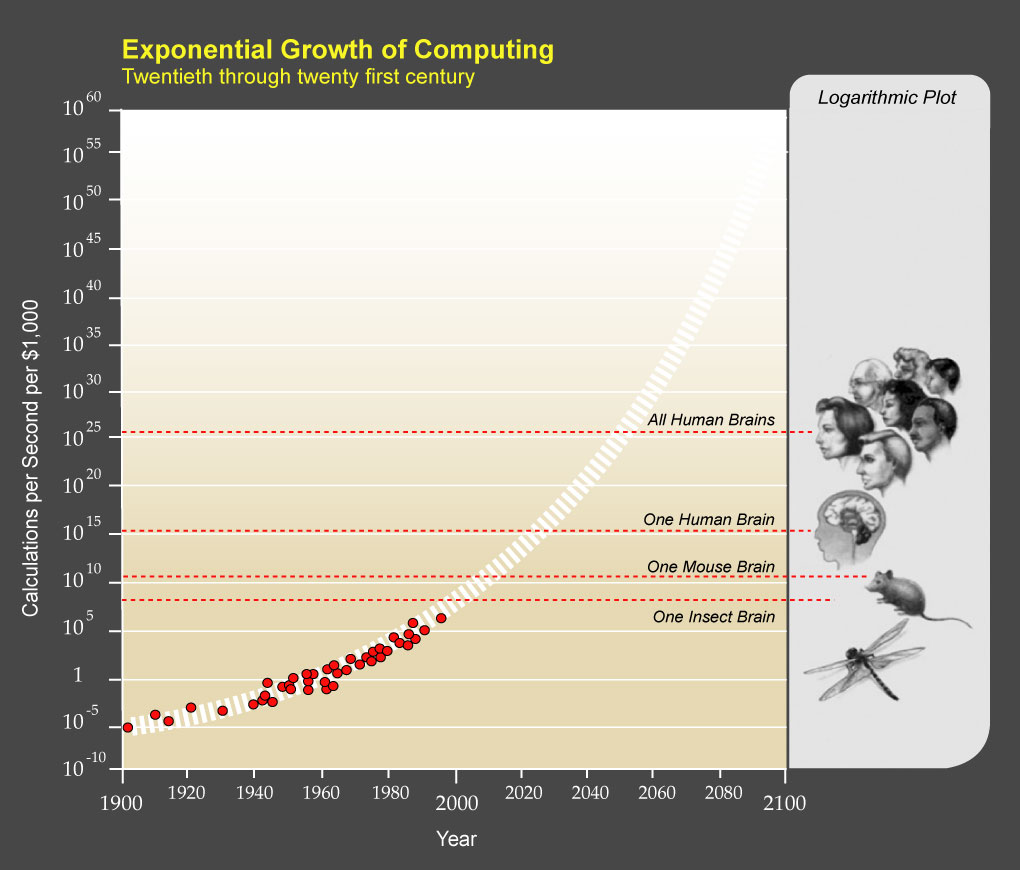
Computer power grows exponentially.

Exponential growth in supercomputer power

According to Kurzweil, since the beginning of evolution, more complex life forms have been evolving exponentially faster, with shorter and shorter intervals between the emergence of radically new life forms, such as human beings, who have the capacity to engineer (i.e. intentionally design with efficiency) a new trait which replaces relatively blind evolutionary mechanisms of selection for efficiency. By extension, the rate of technical progress amongst humans has also been exponentially increasing: as we discover more effective ways to do things, we also discover more effective ways to learn, e.g. language, numbers, written language, philosophy, scientific method, instruments of observation, tallying devices, mechanical calculators, computers; each of these major advances in our ability to account for information occurs increasingly close to the previous. Already within the past sixty years, life in the industrialized world has changed almost beyond recognition except for living memories from the first half of the 20th century. This pattern will culminate in unimaginable technological progress in the 21st century, leading to a singularity. Kurzweil elaborates on his views in his books The Age of Spiritual Machines and The Singularity Is Near.

== Model ==
The model for The Law of Accelerating Returns is as follows:

$V = C_a {(C_b ^ {\; C_c t})} ^ {C_d t}$

Assumptions: $W = C_2 \int_0^t N V, \quad N = C_4 ^ {\;C_5 t}$

Where:

V - Velocity (power of computing, measured in calculations per second per unit cost)

W - World knowledge (as it pertains to designing and building computational devices)

t - Time

N - Expenditures for computation (to get double exponential growth)

== Predictions ==
Ray Kurzweil uses The Law of Accelerating Returns to make predictions about the future.

Kurzweil has a dense chapter of predictions for each of these years: 2009, 2019, 2029, 2099. For example, when discussing the year 2009 he makes many separate predictions related to computer hardware, education, people with disabilities, communication, business and economics, politics and society, the arts, warfare, health and medicine, and philosophy.

As one example he predicts a 2009 computer will be a tablet or smaller sized device with a high quality but somewhat conventional display, while in 2019 computers are "largely invisible" and images are mostly projected directly into the retina, and by 2029 he predicts computers will communicate through direct neural pathways. Similarly in 2009 he says there is interest and speculation about the Turing test, by 2019 there are "prevalent reports" of computers passing the test, but not rigorously, while by 2029 machines "routinely" pass the test, although there is still controversy about how machine and human intelligence compare.

In 2009 he writes it will take a supercomputer to match the power of one human brain, in 2019 $4,000 will accomplish the same thing, while in 2029 $1,000 will buy the equivalent of 1000 humans brains. Dollar figures are in 1999 dollars. Kurzweil predicts life expectancy will rise to "over one hundred" by 2019, to 120 by 2029, and will be indefinitely long by 2099 as humans and computers will have merged.
