= Nanochondrion =

Nanochondria are hypothetical nanomachines that are meant to live inside or with biological cells. They are named after mitochondria, due to their similarities in working inside the cell, and their reproduction.

== Abilities ==
Nanochondria would be able to replicate themselves within the body, even to the point where a mother would pass them on to her children, reducing the need for them to be implanted after the first generation. Even a single nanochondrion inside of an egg cell would be able to replicate to the point where the person that was born from the egg would have nanochondria in every cell in their body. They would interact with and modify cells in the body, potentially allowing people to modify or even make copies of themselves. Due to this, they have been criticized for their ability to make synthetic humans, or even "natural robots", as well as their potential to damage DNA. Nanochondria would even allow a person to exhale a utility fog, allowing them to in effect "breathe" a needed tool.

Nanochondria would have to be incredibly small, which would limit their computational power. To remedy this, they would be likely be able to communicate with each other, as well as other devices inside and outside the body, in an internalnet, in a distributed computing network. This would be likely to be accomplished by acoustic wave communication, or using wires composed of single electrons. Anders Sandberg has commented saying that "mitochondria ... just react on local conditions and indirectly cooperate". and that "It might be hard to make those pipes reliable", although he conceded that "linked nanochondria will be much more versatile". Nanochondria could be used to perform a diagnostic test on a person's own body, and then used to fix or even modify cells.

== See also ==
- Cyborg
- Implications of nanotechnology
- Nanomedicine
