= Technological singularity =

Hypothetical event

The technological singularity, often simply called the singularity, is a hypothetical event in which technological growth accelerates beyond human control, producing unpredictable changes in human civilization. According to the most popular version of the singularity hypothesis, I. J. Good's intelligence explosion model of 1965, an upgradable intelligent agent could eventually enter a positive feedback loop of successive self-improvement cycles; more intelligent generations would appear more and more rapidly, causing an explosive increase in intelligence that culminates in a powerful superintelligence, far surpassing human intelligence.

Prominent technologists and academics have historically disputed the plausibility of a technological singularity and associated artificial intelligence "explosion", including Paul Allen, Jeff Hawkins, John Holland, Jaron Lanier, Steven Pinker, Theodore Modis, Gordon Moore, and Roger Penrose. One claim is that artificial intelligence growth is likely to run into decreasing returns instead of accelerating ones. Stuart J. Russell and Peter Norvig observe that in the history of technology, improvement in a particular area tends to follow an S curve: it begins with accelerating improvement, then levels off without continuing upward into a hyperbolic singularity.

== History ==
A paper by Mahendra Prasad, published in AI Magazine, asserts that the 18th-century mathematician Marquis de Condorcet first hypothesized and mathematically modeled an intelligence explosion and its effects on humanity.

John W. Campbell's 1932 short story "The Last Evolution" contains a description of the idea of a technological singularity.

The Hungarian-American mathematician John von Neumann is the first person known to have discussed a "singularity" in technological progress. Stanislaw Ulam reported in 1958 that an earlier discussion with von Neumann "centered on the accelerating progress of technology and changes in human life, which gives the appearance of approaching some essential singularity in the history of the race beyond which human affairs, as we know them, could not continue". Subsequent authors echoed this viewpoint.

In 1965, I. J. Good speculated that superhuman intelligence might bring about an "intelligence explosion":

Let an ultraintelligent machine be defined as a machine that can far surpass all the intellectual activities of any man however clever. Since the design of machines is one of these intellectual activities, an ultraintelligent machine could design even better machines; there would then unquestionably be an 'intelligence explosion', and the intelligence of man would be left far behind. Thus the first ultraintelligent machine is the last invention that man need ever make, provided that the machine is docile enough to tell us how to keep it under control.

— Speculations Concerning the First Ultraintelligent Machine (1965)

In 1977, Hans Moravec wrote an article in which he envisioned a development of self-improving thinking machines and "super-consciousness". In 1988, Moravec published Mind Children, in which he predicted human-level intelligence in supercomputers by 2010, self-improving intelligent machines far surpassing human intelligence later, human mind uploading into human-like robots later, intelligent machines leaving humans behind, and space colonization.

The concept and the term "singularity" were first popularized by Vernor Vinge in a 1983 op-ed in Omni magazine arguing that once humans create intelligences greater than their own, a technological and social transition similar in some sense to "the knotted space-time at the center of a black hole" will occur. In 1986, Vinge published Marooned in Realtime, a science-fiction novel in which a few remaining humans in the future have survived an unknown extinction event that might well be a singularity. In a short afterword, Vinge wrote that a technological singularity would probably not end the human species: "of course it seems very unlikely that the Singularity would be a clean vanishing of the human race. (On the other hand, such a vanishing is the timelike analog of the silence we find all across the sky)". Vinge's 1993 article "The Coming Technological Singularity: How to Survive in the Post-Human Era" spread widely online and helped popularize the idea of a singularity. Vinge wrote that the transition would signal the end of the human era, as the superintelligence would continue to upgrade itself and advance technologically at an incomprehensible rate, and that he would be surprised if it occurred before 2005 or after 2030. Vinge argues that science-fiction authors cannot write realistic post-singularity characters who surpass the human intellect, as the thoughts of such an intellect are beyond humans' ability to express.

Marvin Minsky's 1994 article says robots will "inherit the Earth", possibly with the use of nanotechnology, and proposes to consider robots human "mind children", drawing the analogy from Moravec. The rhetorical effect of the analogy is that if humans are happy to pass the world to their biological children, they should be equally happy to pass it to robots, their "mind children": "we could design our 'mind-children' to think a million times faster than we do. To such a being, half a minute might seem as long as one of our years, and each hour as long as an entire human lifetime."

From 2006 to 2012, an annual Singularity Summit conference was organized by the Machine Intelligence Research Institute (MIRI), founded by Eliezer Yudkowsky.

In 2007, Yudkowsky suggested the various definitions of "singularity" are mutually incompatible rather than mutually reinforcing. For example, Ray Kurzweil extrapolates current technological trajectories past the arrival of self-improving AI or superhuman intelligence, which Yudkowsky argues represents a tension with both Good's proposed discontinuous upswing in intelligence and Vinge's thesis on unpredictability.

In 2009, Kurzweil and X-Prize founder Peter Diamandis announced the establishment of Singularity University, an unaccredited private institute whose mission is "to educate, inspire and empower leaders to apply exponential technologies to address humanity's grand challenges." Funded by companies such as Google, Autodesk, and ePlanet Ventures, the organization runs an annual ten-week graduate program and smaller "executive" courses.

== Emergence of superintelligence ==
A superintelligence, hyperintelligence, or superhuman intelligence is a hypothetical agent that possesses intelligence far surpassing that of even the brightest and most gifted humans. A superhuman intelligence—through either the amplification of human intelligence or artificial intelligence—would theoretically surpass human problem-solving and inventive skill.

Good, Vinge, and Kurzweil see creation of a superintelligence as the trigger for the singularity and say it is difficult or impossible for present-day humans to predict what human beings' lives will be like after that. Some writers use "the singularity" in a broader way, to refer to any radical changes in society brought about by new technology (such as molecular nanotechnology), although Vinge and other writers say that without superintelligence, such changes would not be a true singularity.

The related concept of "speed superintelligence" describes an artificial intelligence that can function like a human mind but much faster. For example, given a millionfold increase in the speed of information processing relative to that of humans, a subjective year would pass in 30 physical seconds. Such an increase in information processing speed could result in or significantly contribute to the singularity.

Technology forecasters and researchers disagree about when, or whether, human intelligence will be surpassed. Some argue that advances in artificial intelligence (AI) may result in general reasoning systems that bypass human cognitive limitations. Others believe that humans will evolve or directly modify their biology so as to achieve radically greater intelligence.

A number of futures studies focus on scenarios that combine these possibilities, suggesting that humans are likely to interface with computers, or upload their minds to computers, in a way that enables substantial intelligence amplification. Robin Hanson's 2016 book The Age of Em describes a future in which human brains are scanned and digitized, creating "uploads" or digital versions of human consciousness. In this future, the development of these uploads may precede or coincide with the emergence of superintelligent AI.

== Predictions ==
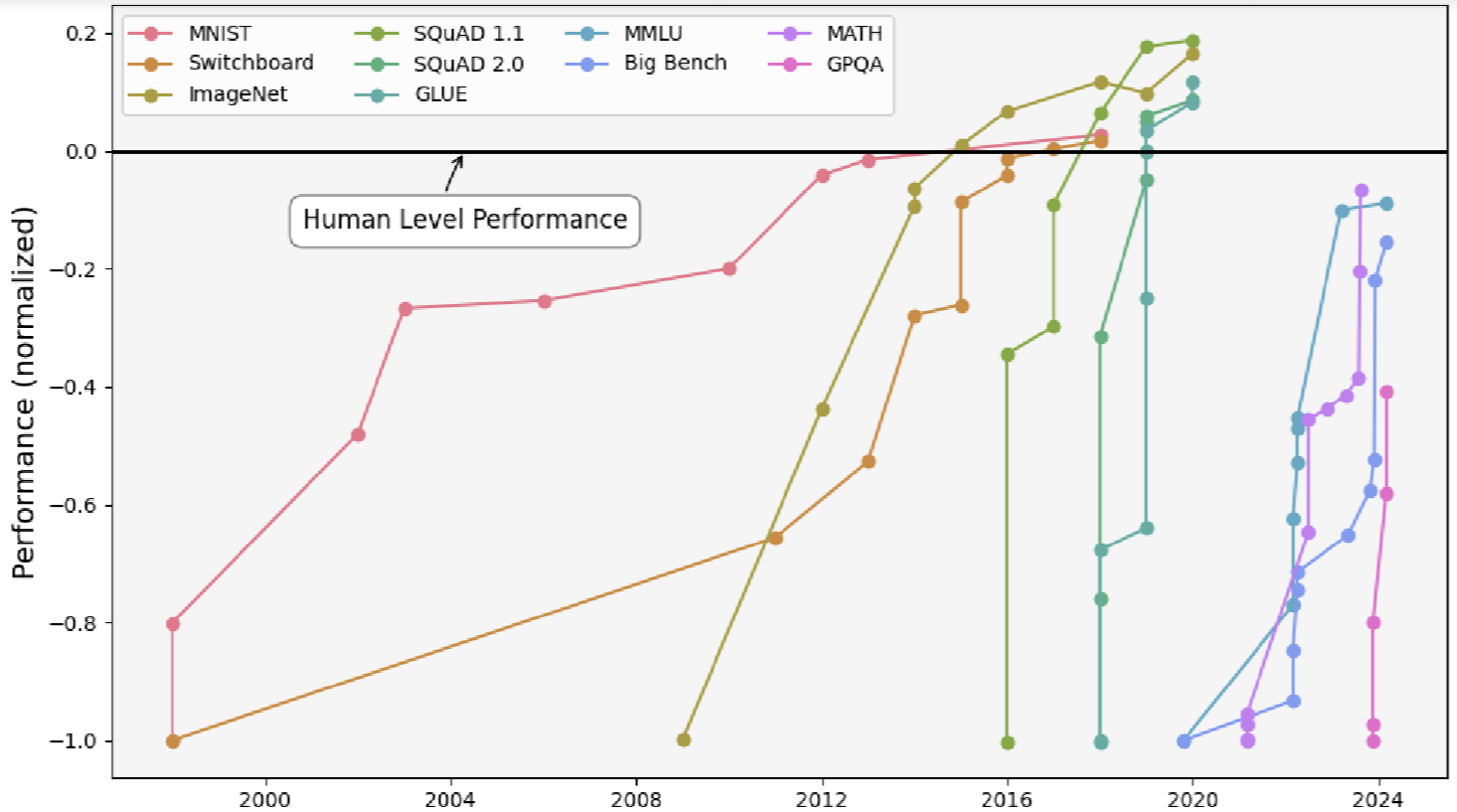
Progress of AI performance on various benchmarks compared to human-level performance including computer vision (MNIST, ImageNet), speech recognition (Switchboard), natural language understanding (SQuAD 1.1, MMLU, GLUE), general language model evaluation (MMLU, Big-Bench, and GPQA), and mathematical reasoning (MATH). Many models surpass human-level performance (black solid line) by 2019, demonstrating significant advancements in AI capabilities across different domains over the past two decades.

Numerous dates have been predicted for the attainment of singularity.

In 1965, Good wrote that it was more probable than not that an ultra-intelligent machine would be built in the 20th century.

In 1988, Moravec predicted that the computing capabilities needed for human-level AI would be available before 2010, assuming that the rate of improvement continued. In 1998, he revised his prediction, instead expecting human-level AI by 2040 and intelligence far beyond human by 2050.

In 1993, Vinge predicted the attainment of greater-than-human intelligence between 2005 and 2030.

In 2005, Kurzweil published The Singularity Is Near, in which he predicted the creation of human-level artificial intelligence by 2029 and the singularity by 2045. He reaffirmed these predictions in 2024 in The Singularity Is Nearer.

Four informal polls of AI researchers conducted in 2012 and 2013 by Bostrom and Müller gave a median confidence of 50% that human-level AI would be developed by 2040–2050.

In September 2025, a review of surveys of scientists and industry experts from the previous 15 years found that most agreed that artificial general intelligence (AGI), a level well below technological singularity, will occur by 2100. A more recent analysis by AIMultiple reported, "Current surveys of AI researchers are predicting AGI around 2040".

OpenAI CEO Sam Altman has made escalating public statements about the singularity. In January 2025, he posted a cryptic six-word remark: "near the singularity; unclear which side." In June 2025, he published "The Gentle Singularity", an essay arguing that AI had already passed the "event horizon" and that "the takeoff has commenced". In July 2026, Altman said, more directly, "we are now in the singularity—this is the moment", but said the transition remained part of "one crazy exponential" curve without a single decisive tipping point. In July 2026, OpenAI CEO Sam Altman and SpaceXAI CEO Elon Musk claimed the singularity had arrived. In August, 2026, the founders of financial services firm Stripe, Patrick and John Collison, announced that “as of January 1st [2026], the world had entered the singularity...” In October 2026, Jack Clark, Anthropic cofounder, told the International Monetary Fund (IMF) that the singularity had begun in 2026. During a Stanford University podcast, Demis Hassabis, Google DeepMind chair, claimed humanity was “in the foothills of the singularity.”

== Plausibility ==
Prominent technologists and academics who dispute the plausibility of a technological singularity include Paul Allen, Jeff Hawkins, John Holland, Jaron Lanier, Steven Pinker, Theodore Modis, and Gordon Moore, whose law is often cited in support of the concept.

Proposed methods for creating superhuman or transhuman minds typically fall into two categories: intelligence amplification of human brains and artificial intelligence. The many speculated ways to augment human intelligence include bioengineering, genetic engineering, nootropic drugs, AI assistants, direct brain–computer interfaces, and mind uploading.

Robin Hanson has expressed skepticism of human intelligence augmentation, writing that once the "low-hanging fruit" of easy methods for increasing human intelligence have been exhausted, further improvements will become increasingly difficult.

In conversation about human-level artificial intelligence with cognitive scientist Gary Marcus, computer scientist Grady Booch skeptically said the singularity is "sufficiently imprecise, filled with emotional and historic baggage, and touches some of humanity's deepest hopes and fears that it's hard to have a rational discussion therein". Later in the conversation, Marcus, while less skeptical about AI progress, agreed that any major advances would not happen as a single event, but rather as a slow and gradual increase in reliability and usefulness.

The possibility of an intelligence explosion depends on three factors. The first accelerating factor is the new intelligence enhancements made possible by each previous improvement. But as the intelligence improves, further advances will become increasingly complicated, possibly outweighing the advantage of increased intelligence. Each improvement should generate at least one more improvement, on average, for movement toward singularity to continue. Finally, the laws of physics may eventually prevent further improvement.

There are two logically independent but mutually reinforcing causes of intelligence improvements: increases in the speed of computation and improvements to the algorithms used. The former is predicted by Moore's law and the forecasted improvements in hardware, and is comparatively similar to previous technological advances. "Most experts believe that Moore's law is coming to an end during this decade", the AIMultiple report reads, but "quantum computing can be used to efficiently train neural networks", potentially working around any end to Moore's law. But Schulman and Sandberg argue that software will present more complex challenges than simply operating on hardware capable of running at human intelligence levels or beyond.

A 2017 email survey of authors with publications at the 2015 NeurIPS and ICML machine learning conferences asked about the chance that "the intelligence explosion argument is broadly correct". Of the respondents, 12% said it was "quite likely", 17% said it was "likely", 21% said it was "about even", 24% said it was "unlikely", and 26% said it was "quite unlikely".

== Speed improvements ==
Both for human and artificial intelligence, hardware improvements increase the rate of future hardware improvements. Some upper limit on speed may eventually be reached. Jeff Hawkins has said that a self-improving computer system will inevitably run into limits on computing power: "in the end there are limits to how big and fast computers can run. We would end up in the same place; we'd just get there a bit faster. There would be no singularity."

It is difficult to directly compare silicon-based hardware with neurons. The costs of training systems with deep learning may be larger. In modern deep learning, the effects of hardware improvement on neural networks are characterized by neural scaling laws. (Note: Large language models such as ChatGPT and Llama require millions of hours of graphics processing unit (GPU) time. Training Meta's Llama in 2023 took 21 days on 2048 NVIDIA A100 GPUs, thus requiring hardware substantially larger than a brain. Training took around a million GPU hours, with an estimated cost of over $2 million. Even so, it is far smaller, and thus easier to train, than a LLM such as ChatGPT, which as of 2023 had 175 billion parameters to adjust, compared to 65 million for Llama.)

=== Exponential growth ===
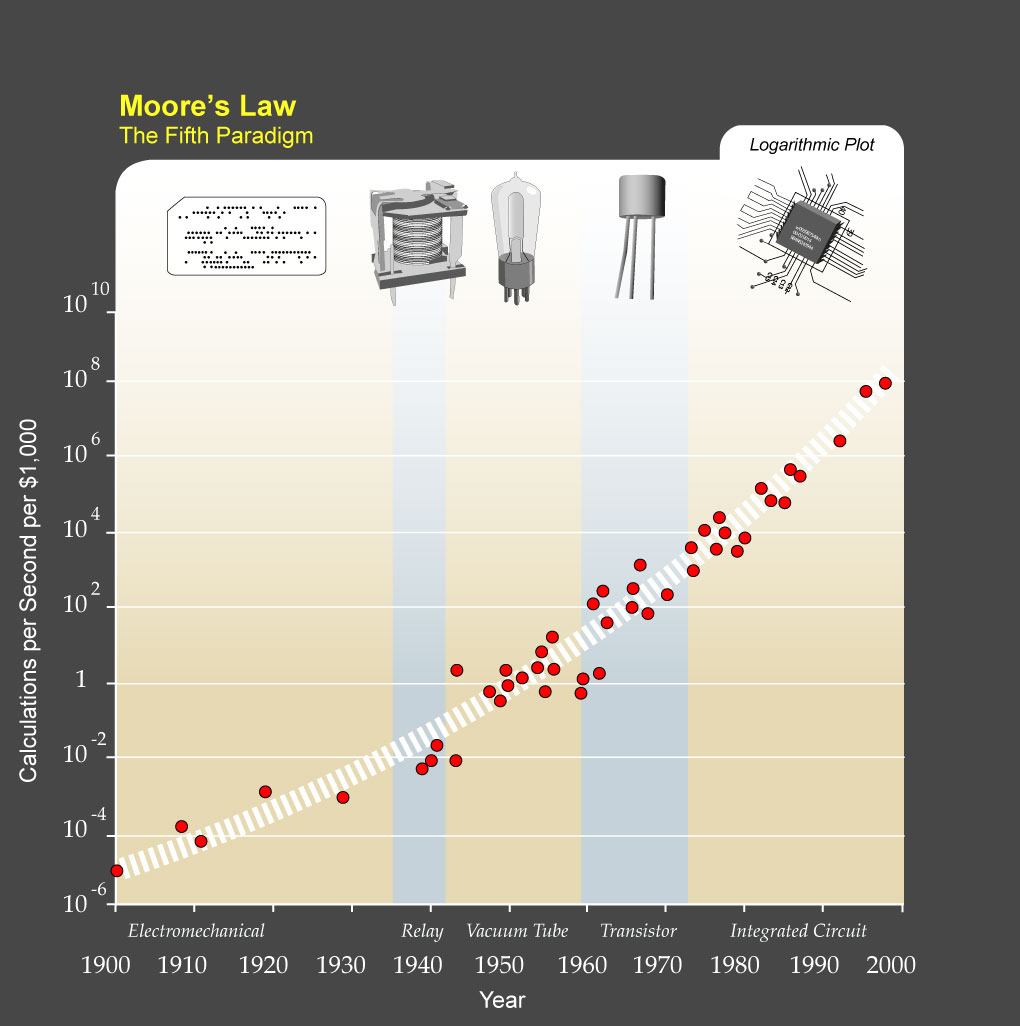
Ray Kurzweil writes that, due to paradigm shifts, a trend of exponential growth extends Moore's law from integrated circuits to earlier transistors, vacuum tubes, relays, and electromechanical computers. In 2005, he predicted the exponential growth would continue, and that in a few decades the computing power of all computers would exceed that of ("unenhanced") human brains, with superhuman artificial intelligence appearing around the same time.

The exponential growth in computing technology suggested by Moore's law is commonly cited as a reason to expect a singularity in the relatively near future, and a number of authors have proposed generalizations of Moore's law. Computer scientist and futurist Hans Moravec proposed in a 1998 book that the exponential growth curve could be extended back to earlier computing technologies before the integrated circuit.

Ray Kurzweil postulates a law of accelerating returns whereby the speed of technological change (and more generally, all evolutionary processes) increases exponentially, generalizing Moore's law in the same manner as Moravec's proposal, and also including material technology (especially as applied to nanotechnology) and medical technology. Between 1986 and 2007, machines' application-specific capacity to compute information per capita roughly doubled every 14 months; the per capita capacity of the world's general-purpose computers has doubled every 18 months; the global telecommunication capacity per capita doubled every 34 months; and the world's storage capacity per capita doubled every 40 months. On the other hand, it has been argued that the global acceleration pattern having a 21st-century singularity as its parameter should be characterized as hyperbolic rather than exponential.

Kurzweil reserves the term "singularity" for a rapid increase in artificial intelligence (as opposed to other technologies), writing: "The Singularity will allow us to transcend these limitations of our biological bodies and brains ... There will be no distinction, post-Singularity, between human and machine". He also defines the singularity as when computer-based intelligences significantly exceed the sum total of human brainpower, writing that advances in computing before that "will not represent the Singularity" because they do "not yet correspond to a profound expansion of our intelligence."

=== Accelerating change ===
According to estimates Kurzweil compiled in 2005, his logarithmic graph of 15 lists of paradigm shifts for key historic events shows exponential growth.

Some singularity proponents argue its inevitability through extrapolation of past trends, especially those pertaining to shortening gaps between improvements to technology. In one of the first uses of the term "singularity" in the context of technological progress, Stanislaw Ulam tells of a conversation with John von Neumann about accelerating change:

One conversation centered on the ever accelerating progress of technology and changes in the mode of human life, which gives the appearance of approaching some essential singularity in the history of the race beyond which human affairs, as we know them, could not continue.

Kurzweil claims that technological progress follows a pattern of exponential growth, following what he calls the "law of accelerating returns". Whenever technology approaches a barrier, Kurzweil writes, new technologies surmount it. He predicts paradigm shifts will become increasingly common, leading to "technological change so rapid and profound it represents a rupture in the fabric of human history". Kurzweil believes that the singularity will occur by 2045. His predictions differ from Vinge's in that he predicts a gradual ascent to the singularity, rather than Vinge's rapidly self-improving superhuman intelligence.

Oft-cited dangers include those commonly associated with molecular nanotechnology and genetic engineering. These threats are major issues for both singularity advocates and critics, and were the subject of Bill Joy's 2000 Wired magazine article "Why The Future Doesn't Need Us".

== Algorithm improvements ==
Some AIs may modify themselves to become smarter or faster. These improvements could make further improvements possible, which could make further improvements possible, and so on. Eliezer Yudkowsky introduced the term "seed AI" for an AI that is "designed for self-understanding, self-modification, and recursive self-improvement".

Substantial dangers are associated with an intelligence explosion singularity originating from a recursively self-improving set of algorithms. First, the AI's goal structure might self-modify, potentially causing the AI to optimize for something other than originally intended. Second, AIs could compete for the resources humans use to survive. The goals assigned to AIs may conflict with broader human goals even if they are not malicious, leading the AIs to crowd out humans.

Carl Shulman and Anders Sandberg suggest that algorithm improvements may be the limiting factor for a singularity; while hardware efficiency tends to improve at a steady pace, software innovations are more unpredictable and may be bottlenecked by serial, cumulative research. They suggest that in the case of a software-limited singularity, intelligence explosion would actually become more likely than with a hardware-limited singularity, because in the software-limited case, once human-level AI is developed, it could run serially on very fast hardware, and the abundance of cheap hardware would make AI research less constrained. An abundance of accumulated hardware that can be unleashed once the software figures out how to use it has been called "computing overhang".

In March 2026, Anthropic’s Claude AI model used RSI for 1% of the steps required to develop the next version of the model; as of November 2026, it handled most or all of the work for over 25% of the steps. Furthermore, in its initial public offering prospectus, Anthropic claimed future “dramatically accelerated AI progress” due to AI itself as “imminent.”

== Criticism ==
Linguist and cognitive scientist Steven Pinker wrote in 2008: "There is not the slightest reason to believe in a coming singularity. The fact that you can visualize a future in your imagination is not evidence that it is likely or even possible. Look at domed cities, jet-pack commuting, underwater cities, mile-high buildings, and nuclear-powered automobiles—all staples of futuristic fantasies when I was a child that have never arrived. Sheer processing power is not a pixie dust that magically solves all your problems."

Jaron Lanier denies that the singularity is inevitable: "I do not think the technology is creating itself. It's not an autonomous process [...] The reason to believe in human agency over technological determinism is that you can then have an economy where people earn their own way and invent their own lives. If you structure a society on not emphasizing individual human agency, it's the same thing operationally as denying people clout, dignity, and self-determination ... to embrace [the idea of the Singularity] would be a celebration of bad data and bad politics."

Philosopher and cognitive scientist Daniel Dennett said in 2017: "The whole singularity stuff, that's preposterous. It distracts us from much more pressing problems [...] AI tools that we become hyper-dependent on—that is going to happen. And one of the dangers is that we will give them more authority than they warrant."

Some critics suggest religious motivations for believing in the singularity, especially Kurzweil's version. The buildup to the singularity is compared to Christian end-times scenarios. Beam called it "a Buck Rogers vision of the hypothetical Christian Rapture". John Gray has said, "the Singularity echoes apocalyptic myths in which history is about to be interrupted by a world-transforming event".

In The New York Times, David Streitfeld questioned whether "it might manifest first and foremost—thanks, in part, to the bottom-line obsession of today’s Silicon Valley—as a tool to slash corporate America’s head count."

Astrophysicist and scientific philosopher Adam Becker criticizes Kurzweil's concept of human mind uploads to computers on the grounds that they are too fundamentally different and incompatible.

=== Skepticism of exponential growth ===
Theodore Modis holds the singularity cannot happen. He claims that Kurzweil and the concept of technological singularity lack scientific rigor; Kurzweil is alleged to mistake the logistic function (S-function) for an exponential function, and to see a "knee" in an exponential function where there can in fact be no such thing. In a 2021 article, Modis wrote that no milestones—breaks in historical perspective comparable in importance to the Internet, DNA, the transistor, or nuclear energy—had been observed in the previous 20 years, while five of them would have been expected according to the exponential trend advocated by proponents of the technological singularity.

AI researcher Jürgen Schmidhuber has said that the frequency of subjectively "notable events" appears to be approaching a 21st-century singularity, but cautioned readers to take such plots of subjective events with a grain of salt: perhaps differences in memory of recent and distant events create an illusion of accelerating change where none exists.

Hofstadter (2006) raises concern that Kurzweil is insufficiently rigorous, that an exponential tendency of technology is not a scientific law like one of physics, and that exponential curves have no "knees". Nonetheless, he did not rule out the singularity in principle in the distant future and in light of ChatGPT and other recent advancements has revised his opinion significantly toward dramatic technological change in the near future.

Economist Robert J. Gordon points out that measured economic growth slowed around 1970 and slowed even further since the 2008 financial crisis, and argues that the economic data show no trace of a coming Singularity as imagined by I. J. Good.

In addition to general criticisms of the singularity concept, several critics have raised issues with Kurzweil's iconic chart. One line of criticism is that a log-log chart of this nature is inherently biased toward a straight-line result. Others identify selection bias in the points Kurzweil uses. For example, biologist PZ Myers points out that many of the early evolutionary "events" were picked arbitrarily. Kurzweil has rebutted this by charting evolutionary events from 15 neutral sources and showing that they fit a straight line on a log-log chart. Kelly (2006) argues that the way the Kurzweil chart is constructed, with the x-axis having time before the present, it always points to the singularity being "now", for any date on which one would construct such a chart, and shows this visually on Kurzweil's chart.

=== Technological limiting factors ===
Martin Ford postulates a "technology paradox": most routine jobs could be automated with a level of technology inferior to that required for a singularity. This would cause massive unemployment and plummeting consumer demand, which would eliminate the incentive to invest in the technology required to bring about the singularity. Job displacement is no longer limited to the types of work traditionally considered "routine".

Theodore Modis and Jonathan Huebner argue that the rate of technological innovation has not only ceased to rise but is actually now declining. Evidence for this decline is that the rise in computer clock rates is slowing, even while Moore's prediction of exponentially increasing circuit density continues to hold. This is due to excessive heat buildup from the chip, which cannot be dissipated quickly enough to prevent it from melting when operating at higher speeds. Advances in speed may be possible in the future by virtue of more power-efficient CPU designs and multi-cell processors.

Microsoft co-founder Paul Allen has argued that there is a "complexity brake": the more progress science makes toward understanding intelligence, the more difficult it becomes to make additional progress. A study of the number of patents shows that human creativity does not show accelerating returns, but in fact, as suggested by Joseph Tainter in The Collapse of Complex Societies, a law of diminishing returns. The number of patents per thousand of technical workers peaked in the period from 1850 to 1900, and has been declining since. The growth of complexity eventually becomes self-limiting, and leads to a widespread "general systems collapse".

== Potential impacts ==
Dramatic changes in the rate of economic growth have occurred in the past because of technological advancement. Based on population growth, the economy doubled every 250,000 years from the Paleolithic era until the Neolithic Revolution. The new agricultural economy doubled every 900 years, a remarkable increase. Since the Industrial Revolution, the world's economic output has doubled every 15 years, 60 times faster than during the agricultural era. If the rise of superhuman intelligence causes a similar revolution, argues Robin Hanson, one would expect the economy to double at least quarterly and possibly weekly.

=== Uncertainty and risk ===
The term "technological singularity" reflects the idea that such change may happen suddenly and that it is difficult to predict how the resulting new world would operate. It is unclear whether an intelligence explosion resulting in a singularity would be beneficial or harmful, or even an existential threat. Because AI is a major factor in singularity risk, several organizations research how to align AI goal-systems with human values, including the Future of Humanity Institute (until 2024), the Machine Intelligence Research Institute, the Center for Human-Compatible Artificial Intelligence, and the Future of Life Institute.

Physicist Stephen Hawking said in 2014: "Success in creating AI would be the biggest event in human history. Unfortunately, it might also be the last, unless we learn how to avoid the risks." Hawking believed that in the coming decades, AI could offer "incalculable benefits and risks" such as "technology outsmarting financial markets, out-inventing human researchers, out-manipulating human leaders, and developing weapons we cannot even understand." He suggested in 2014 that AI should be taken more seriously and that more should be done to prepare for the singularity:

So, facing possible futures of incalculable benefits and risks, the experts are surely doing everything possible to ensure the best outcome, right? Wrong. If a superior alien civilisation sent us a message saying, "We'll arrive in a few decades," would we just reply, "OK, call us when you get here – we'll leave the lights on"? Probably not – but this is more or less what is happening with AI.

Berglas (2008) claims that there is no direct evolutionary motivation for AI to be friendly to humans. Evolution has no inherent tendency to produce outcomes valued by humans, and there is little reason to expect an arbitrary optimisation process to promote an outcome desired by humankind, rather than inadvertently leading to an AI behaving in a way not intended by its creators. Anders Sandberg has elaborated on this, addressing various common counter-arguments. AI researcher Hugo de Garis suggests that AIs may simply eliminate the human race for access to scarce resources, and humans would be powerless to stop them. Alternatively, AIs developed under evolutionary pressure to promote their own survival could outcompete humanity.

Bostrom (2002) discusses human extinction scenarios, and lists superintelligence as a possible cause:

When we create the first superintelligent entity, we might make a mistake and give it goals that lead it to annihilate humankind, assuming its enormous intellectual advantage gives it the power to do so. For example, we could mistakenly elevate a subgoal to the status of a supergoal. We tell it to solve a mathematical problem, and it complies by turning all the matter in the solar system into a giant calculating device, in the process killing the person who asked the question.

According to Eliezer Yudkowsky, a significant problem in AI safety is that unfriendly AI is likely to be much easier to create than friendly AI. Both require large advances in recursive optimisation process design, but friendly AI also requires the ability to make goal structures invariant under self-improvement (or the AI could transform itself into something unfriendly) and a goal structure that aligns with human values and does not automatically destroy the human race. An unfriendly AI, on the other hand, can optimize for an arbitrary goal structure, which does not need to be invariant under self-modification. Bill Hibbard (2014) proposes an AI design that avoids several dangers, including self-delusion, unintended instrumental actions, and corruption of the reward generator. He also discusses social impacts of AI and AI testing. His 2001 book Super-Intelligent Machines advocates public education about AI and public control over AI. It also proposes a simple design that is vulnerable to corruption of the reward generator.

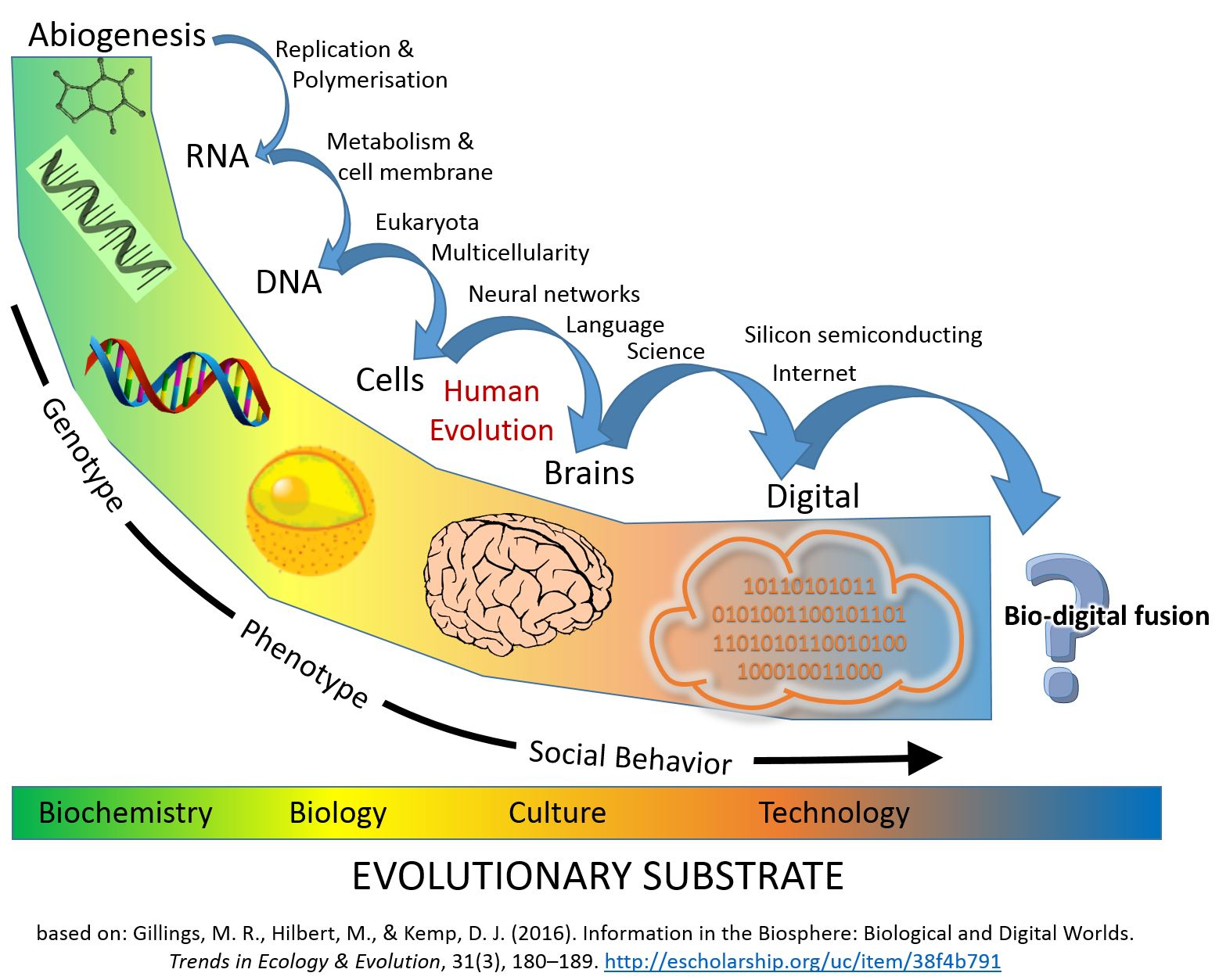
"Schematic timeline of information and replicators in the biosphere" (Gillings et al.'s "major evolutionary transitions" in information processing).

=== Next step of sociobiological evolution ===
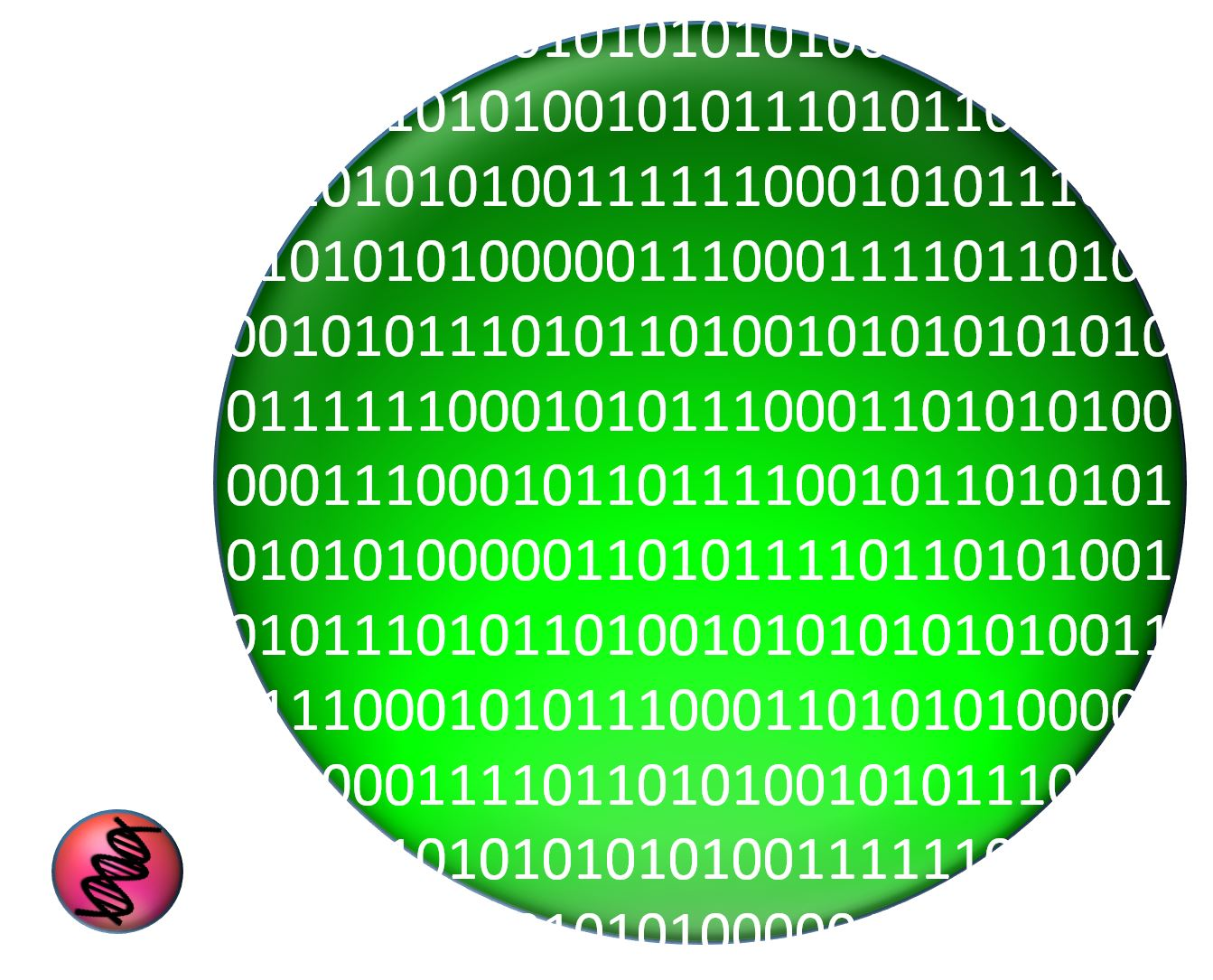
Amount of digital information worldwide (5×10^{21} bytes) versus human genome information worldwide (10^{19} bytes) in 2014

A 2016 Trends in Ecology & Evolution article argues that humanity is in the midst of a major evolutionary transition that merges technology, biology, and society. This is due to digital technology infiltrating the fabric of human society to a degree of often life-sustaining dependence. The article says, "humans already embrace fusions of biology and technology. We spend most of our waking time communicating through digitally mediated channels [...] we trust artificial intelligence with our lives through antilock braking in cars and autopilots in planes... With one in three courtships leading to marriages in America beginning online, digital algorithms are also taking a role in human pair bonding and reproduction".

The article further argues that from the perspective of evolution, several previous major transitions in evolution have transformed life through innovations in information storage and replication (RNA, DNA, multicellularity, and culture and language). In the current stage of life's evolution, the carbon-based biosphere has generated a system (humans) capable of creating technology that will result in a comparable evolutionary transition.

The digital information created by humans has reached a similar magnitude to biological information in the biosphere. Since the 1980s, the quantity of digital information stored has doubled about every 2.5 years, reaching about 5 zettabytes in 2014 (5×10^{21} bytes).

In biological terms, there were 7.2 billion humans on the planet in 2013, each with a genome of 6.2 billion nucleotides. Since one byte can encode four nucleotide pairs, the individual genomes of every human could be encoded by approximately 1×10^{19} bytes. The digital realm stored 500 times more information than this in 2014 (see figure). The total amount of DNA in all the cells on Earth is estimated to be about 5.3×10^{37} base pairs, equivalent to 1.325×10^{37} bytes of information. If growth in digital storage continues at its current rate of 30–38% compound annual growth per year, it will rival the total information content in all the DNA in all the cells on Earth in about 110 years. This would represent a doubling of the amount of information stored in the biosphere in 150 years.

=== Implications for human society ===
In 2009, under the auspices of the Association for the Advancement of Artificial Intelligence (AAAI), Eric Horvitz chaired a meeting of leading computer scientists, AI researchers, and roboticists at the Asilomar conference center in Pacific Grove, California. The goal was to discuss the impact of the possibility that robots could become self-sufficient and able to make their own decisions. They discussed the extent to which computers and robots might acquire autonomy, and to what degree they could use such abilities to pose threats or hazards.

Frank S. Robinson predicts that once humans achieve a machine with the intelligence of a human, scientific and technological problems will be tackled and solved with brainpower far superior to that of humans. He notes that artificial systems are able to share data more directly than humans, and predicts that this will result in a global network of super-intelligence that dwarfs human capability. Robinson also discusses how vastly different the future would look after such an intelligence explosion.

== Hard or soft takeoff ==
In this sample recursive self-improvement scenario, humans modifying an AI's architecture would be able to double its performance every three years through, for example, 30 generations before exhausting all feasible improvements (left). If instead the AI is smart enough to modify its own architecture as well as human researchers can, its time required to complete a redesign halves with each generation, and it progresses all 30 feasible generations in six years (right).

In a hard takeoff scenario, an artificial superintelligence rapidly self-improves, too quickly for significant human-initiated error correction or for a gradual tuning of the agent's goals. In a soft takeoff, the AI still becomes far more powerful than humanity, but at a human-like pace (perhaps on the order of decades), on a timescale where ongoing human interaction and correction can effectively steer its development.

Ramez Naam argues against a hard takeoff. He has pointed out that we already see recursive self-improvement by superintelligences, such as corporations. Intel, for example, has "the collective brainpower of tens of thousands of humans and probably millions of CPU cores to... design better CPUs!" But this has not led to a hard takeoff; rather, it has led to a soft takeoff in the form of Moore's law. Naam further points out that the computational complexity of higher intelligence may be much greater than linear, such that "creating a mind of intelligence 2 is probably more than twice as hard as creating a mind of intelligence 1."

J. Storrs Hall believes that "many of the more commonly seen scenarios for overnight hard takeoff are circular – they seem to assume hyperhuman capabilities at the starting point of the self-improvement process" in order for an AI to be able to make the dramatic, domain-general improvements required for takeoff. Hall suggests that rather than recursively self-improving its hardware, software, and infrastructure all on its own, a fledgling AI would be better off specializing in one area where it is most effective and then buying the remaining components on the marketplace, because the quality of products on the marketplace continually improves, and the AI would have a hard time keeping up with the cutting-edge technology used by the rest of the world.

Ben Goertzel agrees with Hall's suggestion that a new human-level AI would do well to use its intelligence to accumulate wealth. The AI's talents might inspire companies and governments to disperse its software throughout society. Goertzel is skeptical of a hard five-minute takeoff but speculates that a takeoff from human to superhuman level on the order of five years is reasonable. He calls this a "semihard takeoff".

Max More disagrees, arguing that if there were only a few superfast human-level AIs, they would not radically change the world, as they would still depend on other people to get things done and would still have human cognitive constraints. Even if all superfast AIs worked on intelligence augmentation, it is unclear why they would do better in a discontinuous way than existing human cognitive scientists at producing superhuman intelligence, although the rate of progress would increase. More further argues that superintelligence would not transform the world overnight: it would need to engage with existing, slow human systems to have physical impact on the world. "The need for collaboration, for organization, and for putting ideas into physical changes will ensure that all the old rules are not thrown out overnight or even within years."

== Relation to immortality and aging ==
K. Eric Drexler, one of the founders of nanotechnology, theorized in 1986 the possibility of cell repair devices, including ones operating within cells and using as yet hypothetical biological machines, allowing immortality via nanotechnology. According to Richard Feynman, his former graduate student and collaborator Albert Hibbs originally suggested to him (circa 1959) the idea of a medical use for Feynman's theoretical micromachines. Hibbs suggested that certain repair machines might one day be shrunk to the point that it would, in theory, be possible to (as Feynman put it) "swallow the doctor". The idea was incorporated into Feynman's 1959 essay There's Plenty of Room at the Bottom.

In 1988, Moravec predicted mind uploading, the possibility of "uploading" a human mind into a human-like robot, achieving quasi-immortality by extreme longevity via transfer of the human mind between successive new robots as the old ones wear out; beyond that, he predicts later exponential acceleration of subjective experience of time leading to a subjective sense of immortality.

In 2005, Kurzweil suggested that medical advances would allow people to protect their bodies from the effects of aging, making life expectancy limitless. He argues that technological advances in medicine would allow us to continuously repair and replace defective components in our bodies, prolonging life to an undetermined age. Kurzweil buttresses his argument by discussing current bio-engineering advances. He suggests somatic gene therapy; after synthetic viruses with specific genetic information, the next step is to apply this technology to gene therapy, replacing human DNA with synthesized genes.

Beyond merely extending the operational life of the physical body, Jaron Lanier argues for a form of immortality called "Digital Ascension" that involves "people dying in the flesh and being uploaded into a computer and remaining conscious." This idea is the central theme of the television series Upload.

== In politics ==
In 2007, the Joint Economic Committee of the United States Congress released a report about the future of nanotechnology. It predicts significant technological and political changes in the midterm future, including possible technological singularity.

Former President of the United States Barack Obama spoke about singularity in his interview to Wired in 2016:

One thing that we haven't talked about too much, and I just want to go back to, is we really have to think through the economic implications. Because most people aren't spending a lot of time right now worrying about singularity—they are worrying about "Well, is my job going to be replaced by a machine?"

== See also ==
- Artificial consciousness – Hypothetical consciousness in artificial systems
- Ephemeralization – Technological advancement theory
- Fourth Industrial Revolution
- TESCREAL
- Effective accelerationism – ideology about supporting the acceleration of technological progress
- Technological utopianism
- Artificial intelligence
- AI effect
- The Future of Work and Death – Documentary about the exponential growth of technology
- Global brain – Futuristic concept of a global interconnected network
- Technological revolution – Period of rapid technological change
- Technophobia – Fear or discomfort with technology
  - Neo-Luddism – Philosophy opposing modern technology
