= Picotechnology =

Technology with features near one picometer

The term picotechnology is a portmanteau of picometre and technology, intended to parallel the term nanotechnology. It is a hypothetical future level of technological manipulation of matter, on the scale of trillionths of a metre or picoscale (10^{−12}). This is three orders of magnitude smaller than a nanometre (and thus most nanotechnology) and two orders of magnitude smaller than most chemistry transformations and measurements. Picotechnology would involve the manipulation of matter at the atomic level. A further hypothetical development, femtotechnology, would involve working with matter at the subatomic level.

== Applications ==
Picoscience is a term used by some futurists to refer to structuring of matter on a true picometre scale. Picotechnology was described as involving the alteration of the structure and chemical properties of individual atoms, typically through the manipulation of energy states of electrons within an atom to produce metastable (or otherwise stabilized) states with unusual properties, producing some form of exotic atom. Analogous transformations known to exist in the real world are redox chemistry, which can manipulate the oxidation states of atoms; excitation of electrons to metastable excited states as with lasers and some forms of saturable absorption; and the manipulation of the states of excited electrons in Rydberg atoms to encode information. However, none of these processes produces the types of exotic atoms described by futurists.

Alternatively, picotechnology is used by some researchers in nanotechnology to refer to the fabrication of structures where atoms and devices are positioned with sub-nanometre accuracy. This is important where interaction with a single atom or molecule is desired, because of the strength of the interaction between two atoms which are very close. For example, the force between an atom in an atomic force microscope probe tip and an atom in a sample being studied vary exponentially with separation distance, and is sensitive to changes in position on the order of 50 to 100 picometres (due to Pauli exclusion at short ranges and van der Waals forces at long ranges).

== In science fiction ==
The Chinese science fiction novel The Three-Body Problem features a plot-point in which an advanced alien civilization imbues individual protons with supercomputing powers and subsequently manipulates said protons via quantum entanglement (the fictional name for these proton-sized supercomputers is "sophons"). Picotechnology also features in the 2002 science fiction novel, Schild's Ladder.

== See also ==
- Femtotechnology
- IBM in atoms, a 1989 demonstration by IBM of a technology capable of manipulating individual atoms
- Technological singularity
- "There's Plenty of Room at the Bottom", a 1959 lecture by physicist Richard Feynman on the direct manipulation of individual atoms
