= The Singularity Is Nearer =

2024 book by Ray Kurzweil

The Singularity Is Nearer: When We Merge with AI
- Author: Ray Kurzweil
- Language: English
- Publisher: Penguin Books
- Publication date: June 25, 2024
- Publication place: United States
- Pages: 419
- ISBN: 9780399562761
- Preceded by: How to Create a Mind

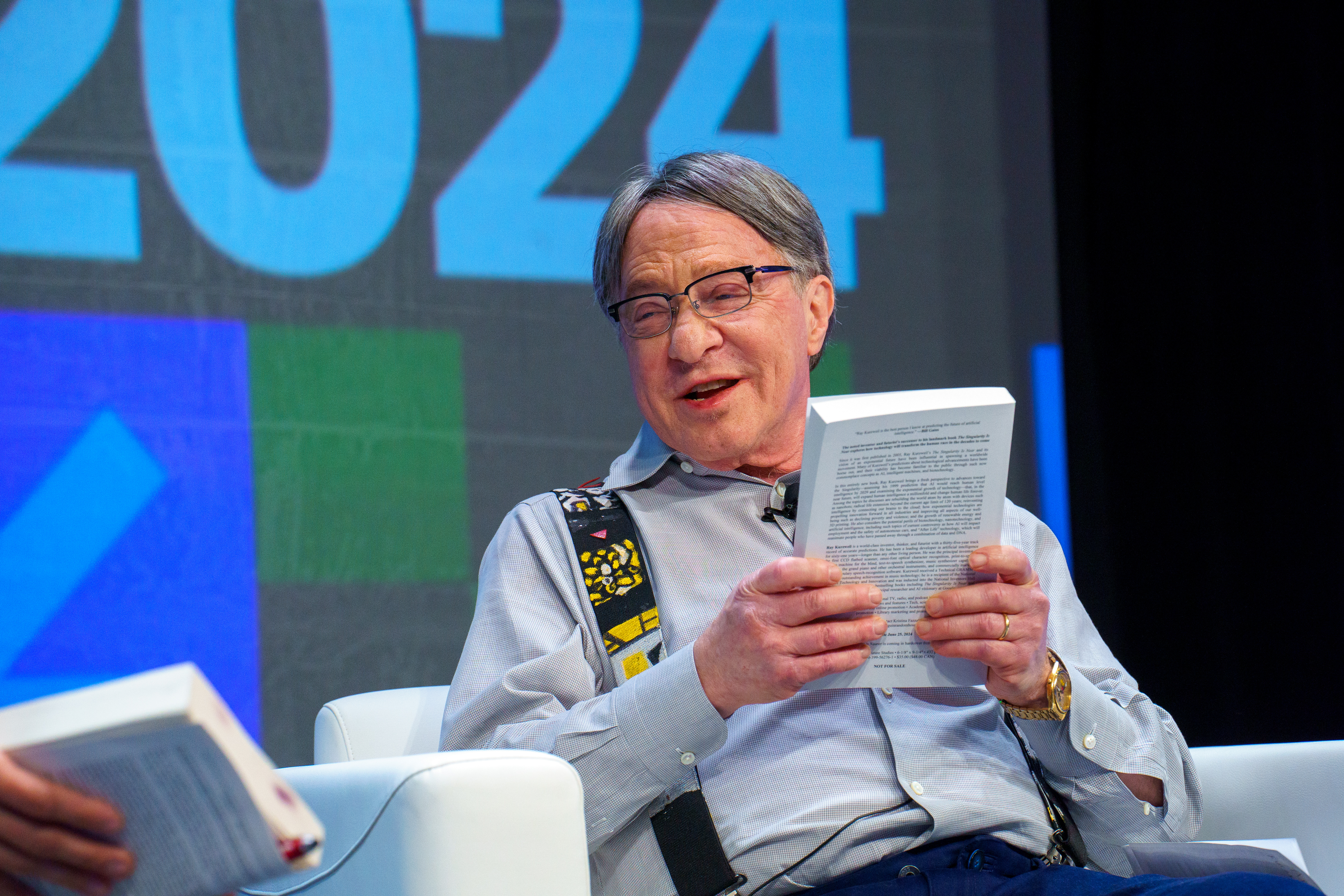
Ray Kurzweil presenting the book at South by Southwest 2024

The Singularity Is Nearer: When We Merge with AI is a nonfiction book by futurist Ray Kurzweil. It is the sequel to his 2005 bestseller, The Singularity Is Near. The book was released on June 25, 2024. Kurzweil reiterates two key dates from the earlier book, which predicted that artificial intelligence (AI) would reach human intelligence by 2029 and that people would merge with machines by 2045, an event he calls "The Singularity".

== Content ==
In an interview with Society for Science and Science News, Kurzweil said the book would contain a chapter "that shows [...] how dramatically every aspect of human life has improved over the decades and over the centuries". He added, "Some people find this frightening. But [the Singularity] is going to be beautiful and will expand our consciousness in ways we can barely imagine, like a person who is deaf hearing the most exquisite symphony for the first time."

== Development ==
The book was initially scheduled to be released in 2021, but was delayed till 2022 and then 2024.

When asked in a 2024 interview with The Guardian why he wrote the book, Kurzweil answered: "The Singularity Is Near talked about the future, but 20 years ago, when people didn't know what AI was", and "It is time to take a look again both at the progress we've made [...] and the coming breakthroughs."

== Reception ==
In The Washington Post, Becca Rothfeld wrote that The Singularity Is Nearer is "daunting to summarize [...] because it is so careless and careening", adding, "Far from the sort of disciplined treatise we might expect from a veteran programmer, this book is a welter of free associations and shameless simplifications." According to Rothfeld, Kurzweil "ventures into foreign territory, with unfortunate results." She wrote, "At times, Kurzweil's prophecies read like passages from messianic religious texts."
