= Wet nanotechnology =

Wet nanotechnology (also known as wet nanotech) involves working up to large masses from small ones.

Wet nanotechnology requires water in which the process occurs. The process also involves chemists and biologists trying to reach larger scales by putting together individual molecules. While Eric Drexler put forth the idea of nano-assemblers working dry, wet nanotech appears to be the likely first area in which something like a nano-assembler may achieve economic results. Pharmaceuticals and bioscience are central features of most nanotech start-ups. Richard A.L. Jones calls nanotechnology that steals bits of natural nanotechnology and puts them in a synthetic structure biokleptic nanotechnology. He calls building with synthetic materials according to nature's design principles biomimetic nanotechnology.

Using these guiding principles could lead to trillions of nanotech robots, that resemble bacteria in structural properties, entering a person's blood stream to do medical treatments.

== Background ==
Wet nanotechnology is an anticipated new sub-discipline of nanotech that is going to mostly be dominated by the different forms of wet engineering. The processes that will be used are going to take place in aqueous solutions and are very close to that of biotechnology manufacturing / bio-molecular manufacturing, which is largely concerned with the production of biomolecules like proteins and DNA/RNA. There is some overlap of Biotechnology and Wet nanotechnology because living things are inherently bottom-up engineered and any exploitation of this by biotechnologists means they dabble in bottom-up engineering (though mostly at the level of producing macromolecules like proteins and nucleic acids from the monomer units. Wet nanotech, however, seeks to analyze living things and their components as engineering systems and aims to understand them completely to have complete control of the behavior of the system and to derive principles and methods that can be applied more broadly to bottom-up manufacturing, to manipulate matter on the atomic and molecular scales, and to create machines or devices at the nanometer and microscopic scales. Biotech is mostly about exploiting living systems in any way possible. Molecular Biology and related disciplines compare the mechanism of function of proteins in particular - and nucleic acids to a lesser extent - as like "molecular machines". In order for engineers to mimic these nanoscale machines in a way that they could be produced with some efficiency, they must look into bottom-up manufacturing. Bottom-up manufacturing deals with manipulating individual atoms during the manufacturing process, so that there is absolute control of their placement and interactions.

From the atomic scale, nanomachines can theoretically be built and designed to self-replicate, assuming they are designed in an environment with a copious amount of the needed materials. Because individual atoms are being manipulated in the process, bottom-up manufacturing is often referred to as “atom by atom” manufacturing. If the manufacturing of nanomachines can be made more accessible through improved techniques, it would start with improvements in making microelectromechanical systems and then would allow for the creation of nanoscale biological sensors along with applications that have not been thought of yet., due to wet nanotechnology being an emerging field. Some scientists and engineers consider that biomimetics is a potential method to start looking at creating nanoscale machines. Humans have only had a few thousand years to try to learn about the mechanics of things at really small scales. Naturally occurring instances of wet nanomachines can be described, such as ATP synthase with an efficiency of about 95%.

== "Wet" vs. "dry" ==
Wet nanotechnology is a form of wet engineering as opposed to dry engineering. There are different fields that deal with those two types of engineering. Biologists, from the point of view of nanotechnology, deal with wet engineering. They study processes that happen in life, and for the most part those processes take place in aqueous environments. Our bodies are made up mostly of water.

Electrical and mechanical engineers are on the other side of the line in dry engineering. They are involved with processes and manufacturing that does not occur in aqueous environments.

For the most part, wet engineering deals with "soft" materials that allow for flexibility which is vital at the nanoscale in biological manufacturing. Dry engineers mostly handle things with rigid structures and parts. These differences stem for the fact that the forces that the two types of engineers must deal with are very different. At a larger scale, most things are dominated by Newtonian physics. However, when one looks at the nanoscale, especially in biological matters, the dominating force is Brownian motion.

Because nanotechnology in the new age is going to most likely deal with both dry and wet in conjunction with each other, there also must be a change in the way society looks at engineering and manufacturing. People will not only have to be well educated in engineering, but also in biology, because the integration of the two is how there will be larger improvements in nanotechnology.

== Brownian motion as it relates to wet nanotech ==
The existence of natural nanomachines, such as ATP synthase and T4 bacteriophage, proves that complex machines can exist that fit both standard definition of a machine and exist at a microscopic scale. Therefore, scientists and biologists know that in principle, artificial machines of the same scale can be designed and made functional. The existence of nanomachines such as ATP synthase has been said to be “second in importance only to DNA”. However, nature's nanomachines have had billions of years to evolve and optimize. Through this process, ATP synthase represents a nanomachine that is 95% efficient, which is a feat that humans have not been able to accomplish yet.

Due to the small scale of these machines in a "wet" environment, effects of Brownian motion can complicate function. Brownian motion is a random, constantly fluctuating force that acts on objects in a microscale environment. While classical mechanical engineering or physics mostly deals with gravity, inertia, and fluid dynamics acting on macro-scale machines, these forces are negligible on the nano scale, while Brownian motion has to be taken into account instead.

Successful human-made nanomachines must therefore work with Brownian motion, not against it. The way that nature has been able to exploit Brownian motion is through self-assembly. This force pushes and pulls all of the proteins and amino acids around in aqueous solvent until they adhere by hydrophobic force, stacking, or charge interactions. Insufficiently strong interactions cannot withstand the Brownian motion and are dissolved rapidly by random movement.

Growing cells in culture to take advantage of their internal chemical synthesis machinery can be considered a form of nanotechnology but this machinery has also been manipulated outside of living cells.
