= Femtotechnology =

Hypothetical atomic scale technology

Femtotechnology is a term used in reference to the hypothetical manipulation of matter on the scale of a femtometer, or 10^{−15} m. This is three orders of magnitude lower than picotechnology, at the scale of 10^{−12} m, and six orders of magnitude lower than nanotechnology, at the scale of 10^{−9} m.

== Theory ==
Work in the femtometer range involves manipulation of excited energy states within atomic nuclei, specifically nuclear isomers, to produce metastable (or otherwise stabilized) states with unusual properties. In the extreme case, excited states of the individual nucleons that make up the atomic nucleus (protons and neutrons) are considered, ostensibly to tailor the behavioral properties of these particles.

The most advanced form of molecular nanotechnology is often imagined to involve self-replicating molecular machines, and there have been some speculations suggesting something similar might be possible with analogues of molecules composed of nucleons rather than atoms. For example, the astrophysicist Frank Drake once speculated about the possibility of self-replicating organisms composed of such nuclear molecules living on the surface of a neutron star, a suggestion taken up in the science fiction novel Dragon's Egg by the physicist Robert Forward. It is thought by physicists that nuclear molecules may be possible, but they would be very short-lived, and whether they could actually be made to perform complex tasks such as self-replication, or what type of technology could be used to manipulate them, is unknown.

== Applications ==
Practical applications of femtotechnology are currently considered to be unlikely. The spacings between nuclear energy levels require equipment capable of efficiently generating and processing gamma rays, without equipment degradation. The nature of the strong interaction is such that excited nuclear states tend to be very unstable (unlike the excited electron states in Rydberg atoms), and there are a finite number of excited states below the nuclear binding energy, unlike the (in principle) infinite number of bound states available to an atom's electrons. Similarly, what is known about the excited states of individual nucleons seems to indicate that these do not produce behavior that in any way makes nucleons easier to use or manipulate, and indicates instead that these excited states are even less stable and fewer in number than the excited states of atomic nuclei.

== In fiction ==
Femtotechnology plays a critical role in the 2005 science-fiction novel Pushing Ice. It also features in various stories by Greg Egan such as Riding the Crocodile, where he proposes the idea of a "strong bullet" which overcomes the instability of high atomic weight femto-structures by being accelerated to near light speed, letting it travel interstellar distances before impacting a target and constructing a stable nano-scale structure as it decays.

== See also ==
- Attophysics
- Femtochemistry
- Mode-locking, a laser technique producing pulses in the femtosecond range
- Ultrashort pulse
