= J. Storrs Hall =

American computer scientist

Josh Hall
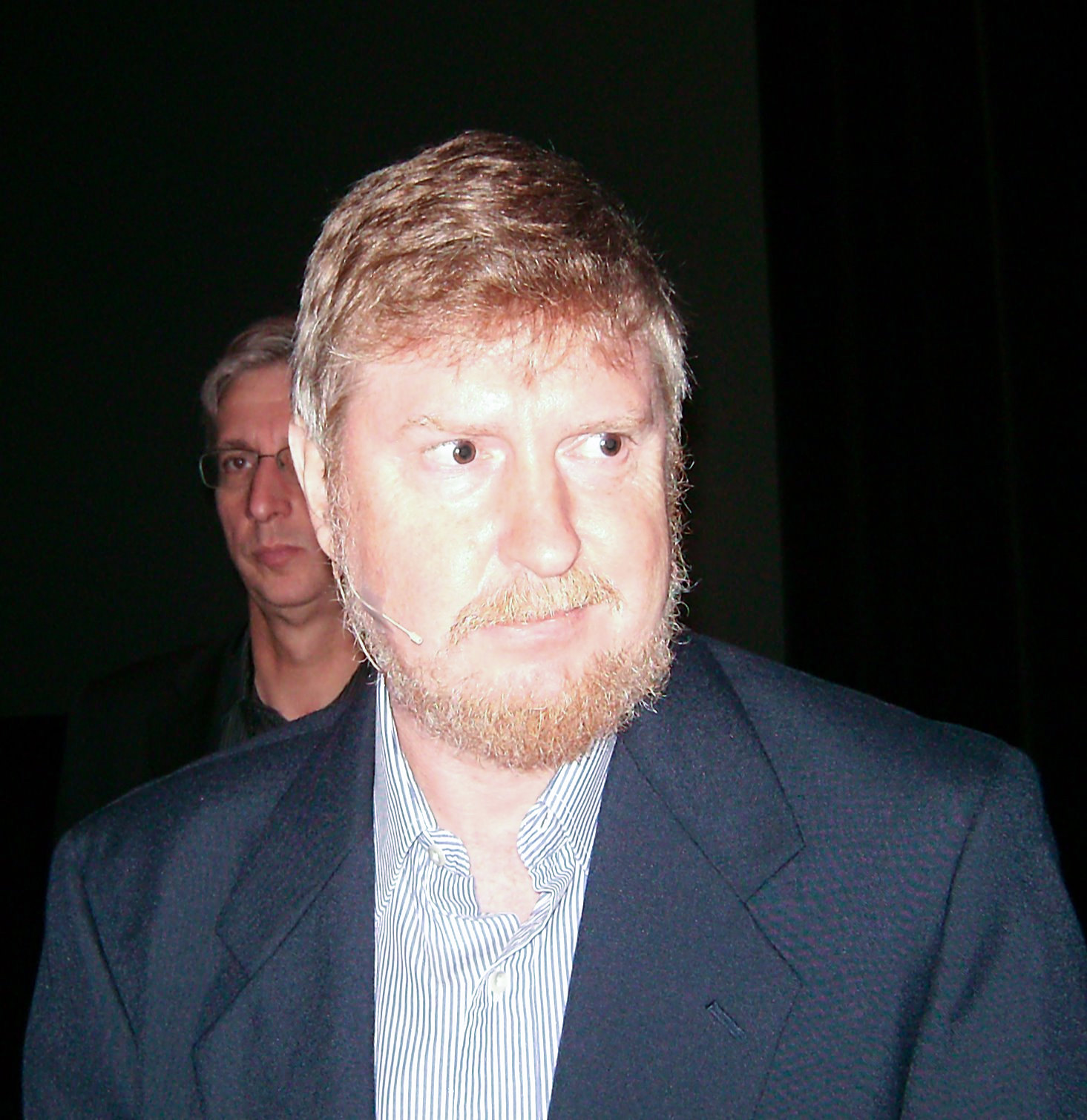
- Storrs Hall in 2007
- Born: John Storrs Hall
- Occupation: Computer scientist
- Website: autogeny.org

John Storrs "Josh" Hall is involved in the field of molecular nanotechnology. He founded the sci.nanotech Usenet newsgroup and moderated it for ten years, and served as the founding chief scientist of Nanorex Inc. for two years. He has written several papers on nanotechnology and developed several ideas such as the utility fog, the space pier, a weather control system called The Weather Machine and a novel flying car.

He is the author of Nanofuture: What's Next for Nanotechnology (ISBN 1-59102-287-8), a fellow of the Molecular Engineering Research Institute and Research Fellow of the Institute for Molecular Manufacturing.

Hall was also a computer systems architect at the Laboratory for Computer Science Research at Rutgers University from 1985 until 1997. In February 2009, Hall was appointed president of the Foresight Institute.

In 2006, the Foresight Nanotech Institute awarded Hall the Feynman Communication Prize.

== Published books ==
- Nanofuture: What's Next For Nanotechnology (2005) ISBN 1-59102-287-8
- Beyond AI: Creating the Conscience of the Machine (2007) ISBN 1-59102-511-7
- Where Is My Flying Car?: A Memoir of Future Past (2018)
