= Mesoscale manufacturing =

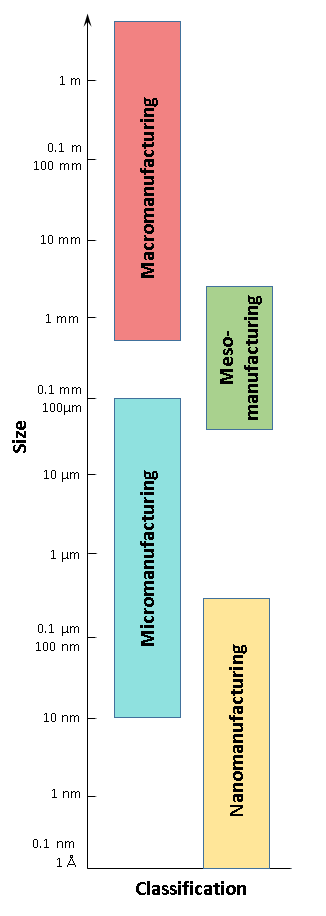
Manufacturing Classification

Mesoscale manufacturing is the process of creating components and products in a range of approximately from 0.1mm to 5mm with high accuracy and precision using a wide variety of engineering materials. Mesomanufacturing processes are filling the gap between macro- and micromanufacturing processes and overlaps both of them (see picture). Other manufacturing technologies are nanoscale (< 100 nm), microscale (100 nm to 100 μm) and macroscale manufacturing (> 0.5 mm).

== Applications ==
Application of mesomanufacturing include electronics, biotechnology, optics, medicine, avionics, communications, and other areas. Specific applications include mechanical watches, and extremely small motors and bearings; lenses for cameras and other micro parts for mobile telephones; micro-batteries, mesoscale fuel cells, microscale pumps, valves, and mixing devices for microchemical reactors; biomedical implants, microholes for fiber optics; medical devices such as stents and valves; mini nozzles for high-temperature jets; mesoscale molds; desktop- or micro-factories, and many others.

== Processes ==
Manufacturing in the mesoscale can be accomplished by scaling down macroscale manufacturing processes or scaling up nanomanufacturing processes. Macroscale techniques like mill and lathe machining have been successfully used to create features in the range of 25 μm. Meso Machine tools (mMTs), for example a miniaturized milling machine, is an expansion of using traditional macroscale techniques to manufacture mesoscale products. With the limitation of self-excited vibration of machine tools and fatigue, microassembly and micro- and mesoscale milling are created to improve the maximum stiffness and dynamic operation of the milling process, which improves the overall performance of manufacturing. The development of mMTs has revealed many challenges that are specific to machining at the small scales. These challenges stem from the large influence of grain size at small scales and the necessity of extremely small tolerances for both the machine tools and the measuring tools.

Laser machining is a traditional technique that uses nanosecond pulses of ultraviolet light to create mesoscale features like holes, fillets, etc. The removal of material during laser machining is proportional to exposure time and therefore this process can be used to create three dimensional features.

A less traditional technique is to use focused ion beam sputtering (FIB) to remove material. This process involves focusing a beam of ions, for example gallium, to the work piece, causing material to be removed. FIB sputtering has a relatively low rate of material removal and therefore has limited application.

Electrical discharge machining (EDM) is another subtractive manufacturing process used in the mesoscale. This process requires that electricity be transferred between the tool electrode and the work piece and therefore it can only be used to manufacture materials that conduct electricity. One advantage of EDM is that it can be used on hard materials that do not work well in traditional machining processes, such as titanium.
