= Molecubes =

Collection of modular robots

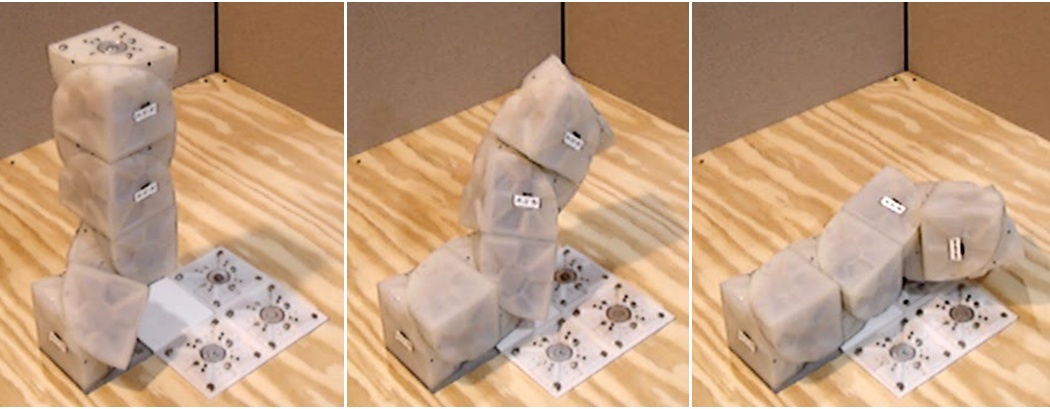
Original molecubes in motion

Molecubes are a collection of modular robots created by Hod Lipson, Victor Zykov and Stathis Mytilinaios from Cornell University. A molecube is made of two rotatable halves, one with the microprocessor which represents the intelligence behind the unit, and the other with a motor for rotating the joint. A group of the cubes can be connected into a variety of shapes.

A robot constructed entirely of molecubes would be able to repair itself using extra cubes, and to create a copy of itself using the same number of cubes. Physical self-reproduction of both a three- and a four-module robot was demonstrated. Subsequent open-source development, with support from Microsoft Research and Festo reduced size and weight of the molecubes. Additional molecube types were produced including: hinges, grippers, batteries, wheels, cameras and more.

== See also ==
- Self-reconfiguring modular robot
