= Symbrion =

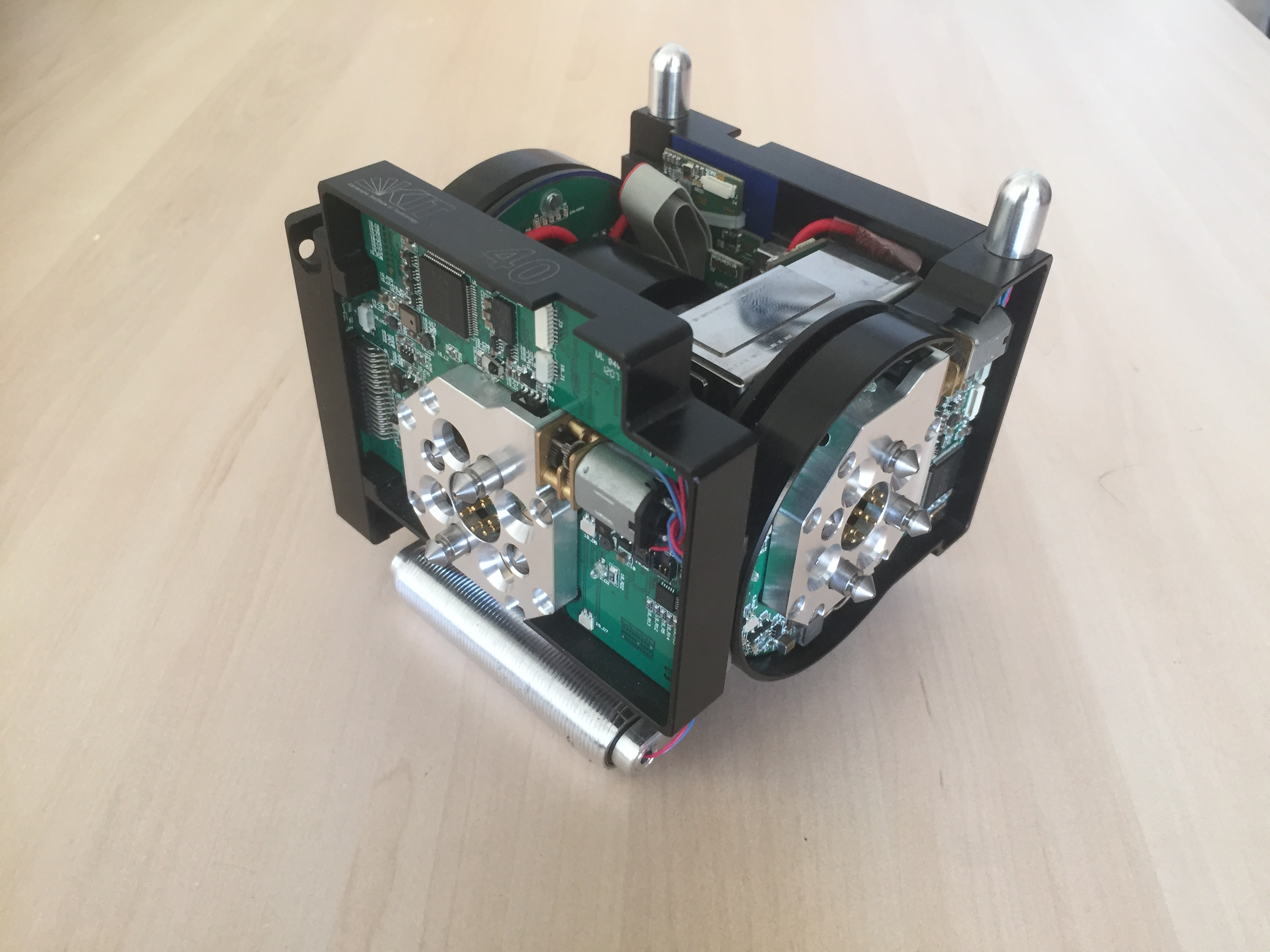
- Commercial?: No
- Type of project: Swarm robotics
- Location: European Union
- Owner: Funded by the European Commission
- Established: 2008
- Closed: 2013
- Status: Closed

Symbrion (Symbiotic Evolutionary Robot Organisms) is a project funded by the European Commission between 2008 and 2013 to develop a framework in which a homogeneous swarm of miniature interdependent robots can co-assemble into a larger robotic organism to gain problem-solving momentum.

One of the key aspects of Symbrion is inspired by the biological world: an artificial genome that allows storing and evolution of suboptimal configurations in order to increase the speed of adaptation.

The SYMBRION project does not start from zero; previous development and research from projects I-SWARM and the open-source SWARMROBOT serve as a mounting point. A large part of the developments within Symbrion is open-source and open-hardware.

== Co-operating universities ==
- University of Stuttgart, Germany (Coordination)
- University of Graz, Austria
- Vrije Universiteit Amsterdam, Netherlands
- University of Karlsruhe (TH), Germany
- Flanders Institute of Biotechnology, Belgium
- University of the West of England, Bristol, UK
- University of Tübingen, Germany
- University of York, UK
- Université Libre de Bruxelles, Belgium
- National Institute for Research in Digital Science and Technology, France
- Czech Technical University in Prague, Czech Republic

== See also ==
- Swarm robotics
