= Chris Phoenix =

Chris Phoenix may refer to:

- Chris Phoenix (rapper) (born 1984), African-American rapper and producer
- Chris Phoenix (nanotechnologist) (born 1970), co-founder of the Center for Responsible Nanotechnology
