= Chris Phoenix (rapper) =

American rapper

- Also known as: Chris Phoenix, MaLus
- Born: Christopher Charles O'Neal; October 23, 1984 (age 41); Jersey City, New Jersey, United States
- Genres: Hip Hop
- Occupations: Rapper, songwriter, record producer
- Instruments: Voice, Piano, Bass Guitar.
- Years active: 2005-present
- Label: Beyond Musiq Records
- Website: BMR homepage

Christopher Charles O'Neal, formerly known as MaLus the PoeT and better known by his stage name Chris Phoenix, is an American rapper and producer. Along with his partner Marcus Sibley, better known as Walkin Contradiction, he is the co-founder of the independent record label Beyond Musiq Records (BMR).

He is the host of the Urban Juke Joint, a well-known poetry event held at the Baháʼí Center in NYC. He is also known for his album "Voicemail", which was circulated through Delaware and New Jersey and widely hailed a classic. Chris created the album using real-life voicemails he received on his answering service. He used these voicemails as a theme for each song on the album.

Chris Phoenix is currently working on his next album, which has not yet been titled. As a producer, he has produced songs for various NJ rap artists and poets, including Grand Finaal (of XB Entertainment), Walkin Contradiction, and Realeyez Mystic. He has collaborated with DJ Amaze and Heartbeat the Producer. He is currently producing albums for poets Rainmaker, Elysee Thomas, and Kalita Cox.

In addition to his music business, he donates his time to the International Youth Organization in Newark, NJ. There, he provides musical activities for young adults in the surrounding neighborhood.

In his personal life, Chris is engaged to be married to Tash Hawthorne, a published author under W Clark Publishing, whose new book "Karma" was scheduled to be released October 2009.
