= Nanotextured surface =

Anti-reflective surface

A nanotextured surface (NTS) is a surface which is covered with nano-sized structures. Such surfaces have one dimension on the nanoscale, i.e., only the thickness of the surface of an object is between 0.1 and 100 nm. They are currently gaining popularity because of their special applications due to their unique physical properties. Nanotextured surfaces are in various forms like cones, columns, or fibers. These are water, ice, oil, and microorganism repellent that is superamphiphobic, anti-icing, and antifouling respectively and thus self-cleaning. They are simultaneously anti-reflective and transparent, hence they are termed smart surfaces.

In research published online October 21, 2013, in Advanced Materials, of a group of scientists at the U.S. Department of Energy's Brookhaven National Laboratory (BNL), led by BNL physicist and lead author Antonio Checco, proposed that nanotexturing surfaces in the form of cones produces highly water-repellent surfaces. These nano-cone textures are superhydrophobic or super-water-hating.

== See also ==
- Gradient multilayer nanofilm (GML nanofilm)
- Nanocages
- Nanocomposite
- Nanofabrics
- Nanofiber
- Nanoflake
- Nanoflower
- Nanofoam
- Nanomesh
- Nanoparticle
- Nanopillar
- Nanofilms
- Nanopin film
- Nanoring
- Nanorod
- Nanoshell
- Quantum dot
- Quantum heterostructure
- Sculptured thin film
