= Nanostructure =

Nanoscale structure of material

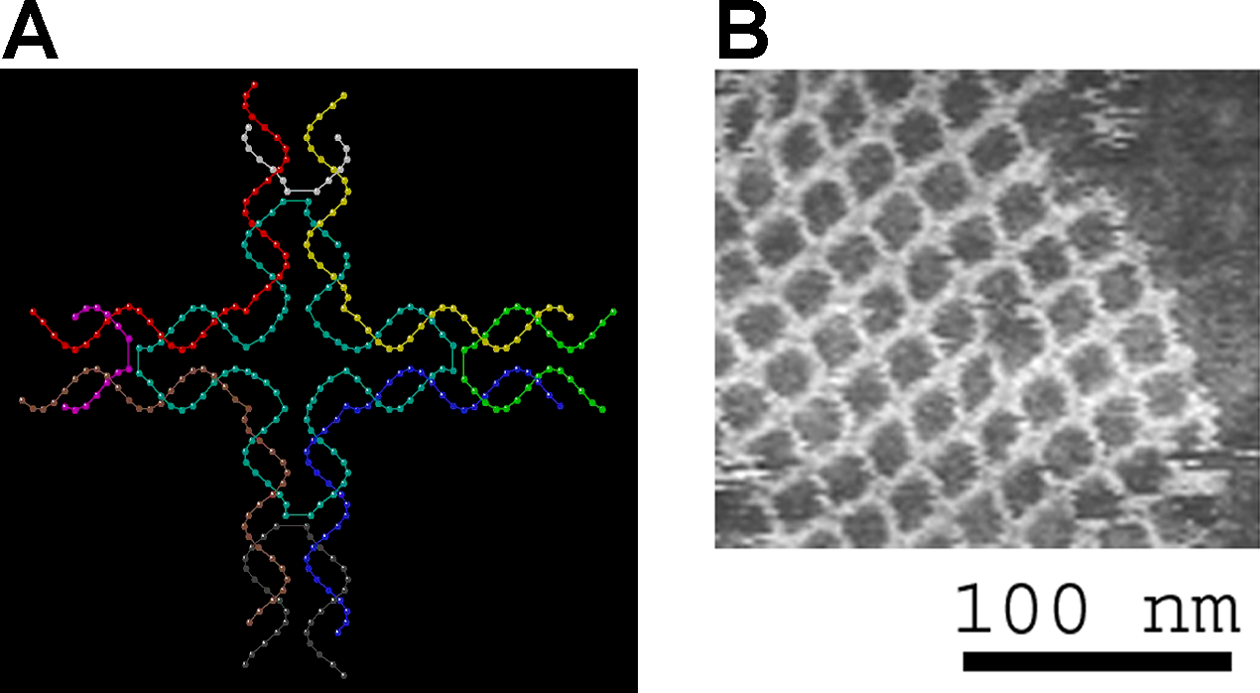
The DNA structure at left (schematic shown) will self-assemble into the structure visualized by atomic force microscopy at right. Image from Strong.

A nanostructure is a structure of intermediate size between microscopic and molecular structures. Nanostructural detail is microstructure at nanoscale.

In describing nanostructures, it is necessary to differentiate between the number of dimensions in the volume of an object which are on the nanoscale. Nanotextured surfaces have one dimension on the nanoscale, i.e., only the thickness of the surface of an object is between 0.1 and 100 nm. Nanotubes have two dimensions on the nanoscale, i.e., the diameter of the tube is between 0.1 and 100 nm; its length can be far more. Finally, spherical nanoparticles have three dimensions on the nanoscale, i.e., the particle is between 0.1 and 100 nm in each spatial dimension. The terms nanoparticles and ultrafine particles (UFP) are often used synonymously although UFP can reach into the micrometre range. The term nanostructure is often used when referring to magnetic technology.

Nanoscale structure in biology is often called ultrastructure.

Properties of nanoscale objects and ensembles of these objects are widely studied in physics.

== List of nanostructures ==
- Gradient multilayer nanofilm (GML nanofilm)
- Icosahedral twins
- Nanocages
- Magnetic nanochains
- Nanocomposite
- Nanofabrics
- Nanofiber
- Nanoflower
- Nanofoam
- Nanohole
- Nanomesh
- Nanoparticle
- Nanopillar
- Nanopin film
- Nanoribbon
- Nanoring
- Nanorod
- Nanosheet
- Nanoshell
- Nanowire
- Nanostructured film
- Self-assembled
- Quantum dot
- Quantum heterostructure
- Sculptured thin film
- Nanofilms

== See also ==
- Nanoarchitecture
- Nanomaterials
- Nanotechnology
- Tube-based nanostructures
- List of software for nanostructures modeling
- Nanocar
- NanoPutian
