= Nanomaterials =

Materials with granular size 1 to 100 nm

Nanomaterials describe, in principle, chemical substances or materials of which a single unit is sized (in at least one dimension) between 1 and 100 nm (the usual definition of nanoscale).

Nanomaterials research takes a materials science-based approach to nanotechnology, leveraging advances in materials metrology and synthesis which have been developed in support of microfabrication research. Materials with structure at the nanoscale often have unique optical, electronic, thermo-physical or mechanical properties. Nanobiomaterials are a specialization of nanomaterials; nanobiomaterials are biomaterials (both natural and synthetic compatible with the human body and typically used in Medicine and its specializations such as dentistry and veterinary) in the nanoscale. Nanobiomaterials are typically used in the field of nanomedicine since they can both actively interact with biological systems and mimic biological structures.

Nanobiomaterials are different from bionanomaterials: whilst nanobiomaterials are biomaterials in the nanoscale, bionanomaterials are all the products of bionanotechnology except nanobiomaterials, i.e., bionanomaterials are all its products that are not used as (nano)biomaterials.

Nanomaterials are slowly becoming commercialized and beginning to emerge as commodities.

== Definition ==
In ISO/TS 80004, nanomaterial is defined as the "material with any external dimension in the nanoscale or having internal structure or surface structure in the nanoscale", with nanoscale defined as the "length range approximately from 1 nm to 100 nm". This includes both nano-objects, which are discrete pieces of material, and nanostructured materials, which have internal or surface structure on the nanoscale; a nanomaterial may be a member of both these categories.

On 18 October 2011, the European Commission adopted the following definition of a nanomaterial for regulatory purpose:

A natural, incidental or manufactured material containing particles, in an unbound state or as an aggregate or as an agglomerate and for 50% or more of the particles in the number size distribution, one or more external dimensions is in the size range 1 nm – 100 nm. In specific cases and where warranted by concerns for the environment, health, safety or competitiveness the number size distribution threshold of 50% may be replaced by a threshold between 1% to 50%.

== Sources ==
=== Engineered ===
Engineered nanomaterials have been deliberately engineered and manufactured by humans to have certain required properties.

Legacy nanomaterials are those that were in commercial production prior to the development of nanotechnology as incremental advancements over other colloidal or particulate materials. They include carbon black and titanium dioxide nanoparticles.

=== Incidental ===
Nanomaterials may be unintentionally produced as a byproduct of mechanical or industrial processes through combustion and vaporization. Sources of incidental nanoparticles include vehicle engine exhausts, smelting, welding fumes, combustion processes from domestic solid fuel heating and cooking. For instance, the class of nanomaterials called fullerenes are generated by burning gas, biomass, and candle. It can also be a byproduct of wear and corrosion products. Incidental atmospheric nanoparticles are often referred to as ultrafine particles, which are unintentionally produced during an intentional operation, and could contribute to air pollution.

=== Natural ===
Biological systems often feature natural, functional nanomaterials. The structure of foraminifera (mainly chalk) and viruses (protein, capsid), the wax crystals covering a lotus or nasturtium leaf, spider and spider-mite silk, the blue hue of tarantulas, the "spatulae" on the bottom of gecko feet, some butterfly wing scales, natural colloids (milk, blood), horny materials (skin, claws, beaks, feathers, horns, hair), paper, cotton, nacre, corals, and even our own bone matrix are all natural organic nanomaterials.

Natural inorganic nanomaterials occur through crystal growth in the diverse chemical conditions of the Earth's crust. For example, clays display complex nanostructures due to anisotropy of their underlying crystal structure, and volcanic activity can give rise to opals, which are an instance of naturally occurring photonic crystals due to their nanoscale structure. Fires represent particularly complex reactions and can produce pigments, cement, fumed silica etc.

Natural sources of nanoparticles include combustion products forest fires, volcanic ash, ocean spray, and the radioactive decay of radon gas. Natural nanomaterials can also be formed through weathering processes of metal- or anion-containing rocks, as well as at acid mine drainage sites.

Gallery of natural nanomaterials

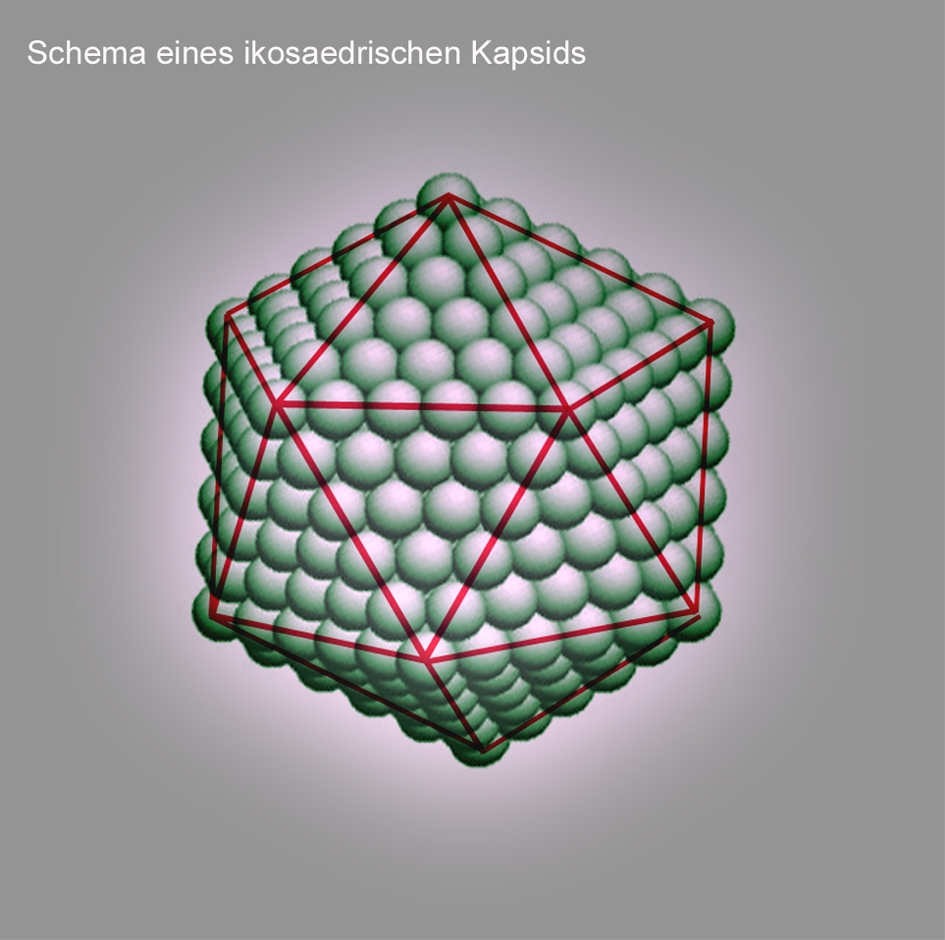
Viral capsid

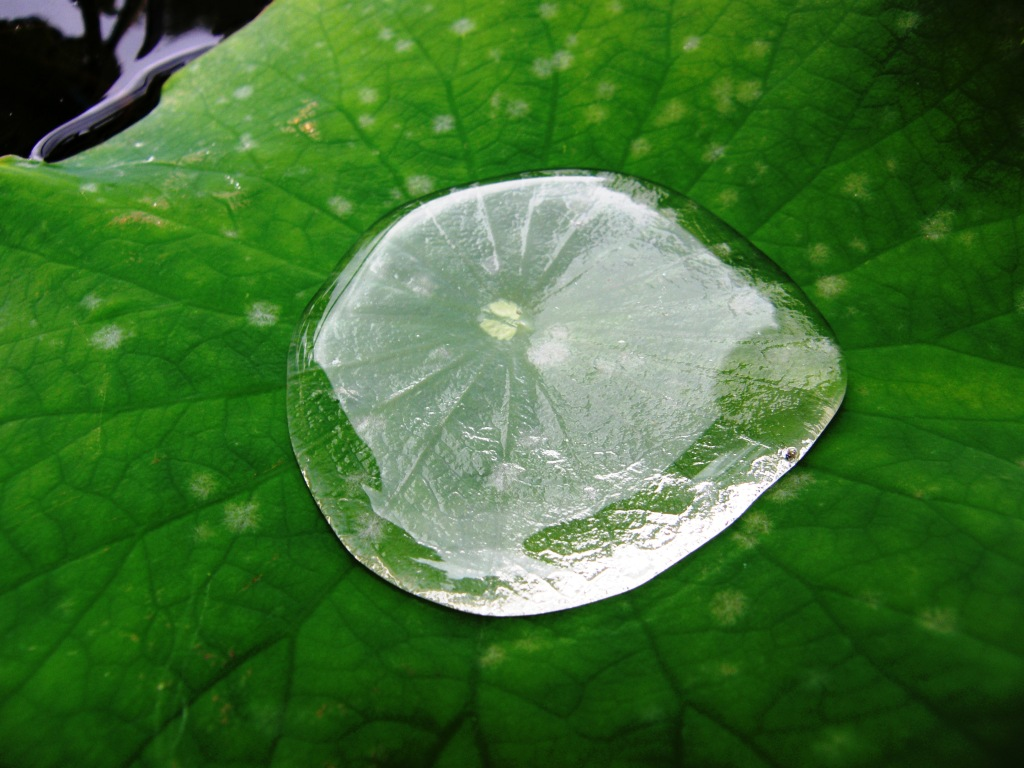
"Lotus effect", hydrophobic effect with self-cleaning ability

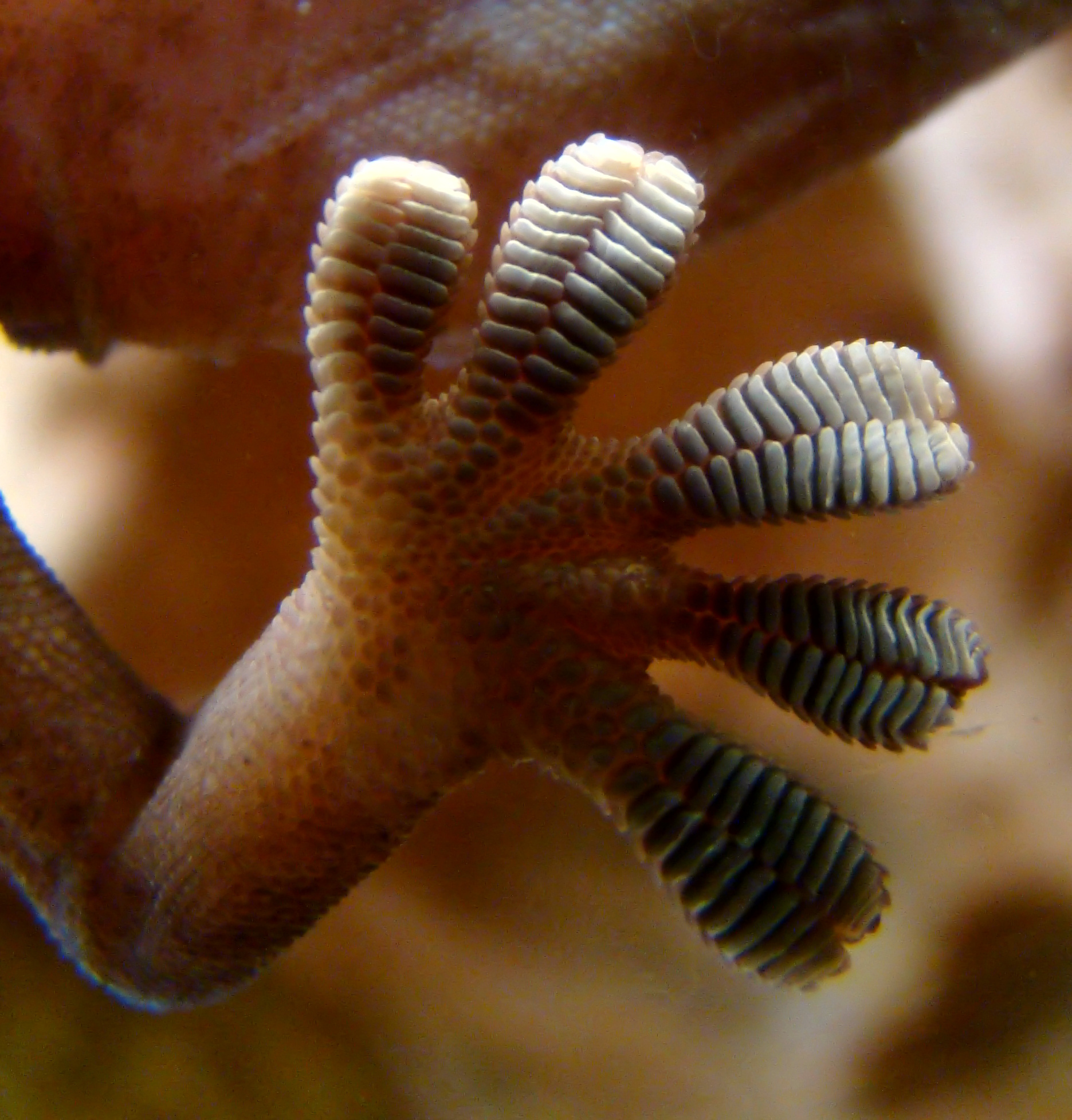
Close-up of the underside of a gecko's foot as it walks on a glass wall (spatula: 200 × 10–15 nm)

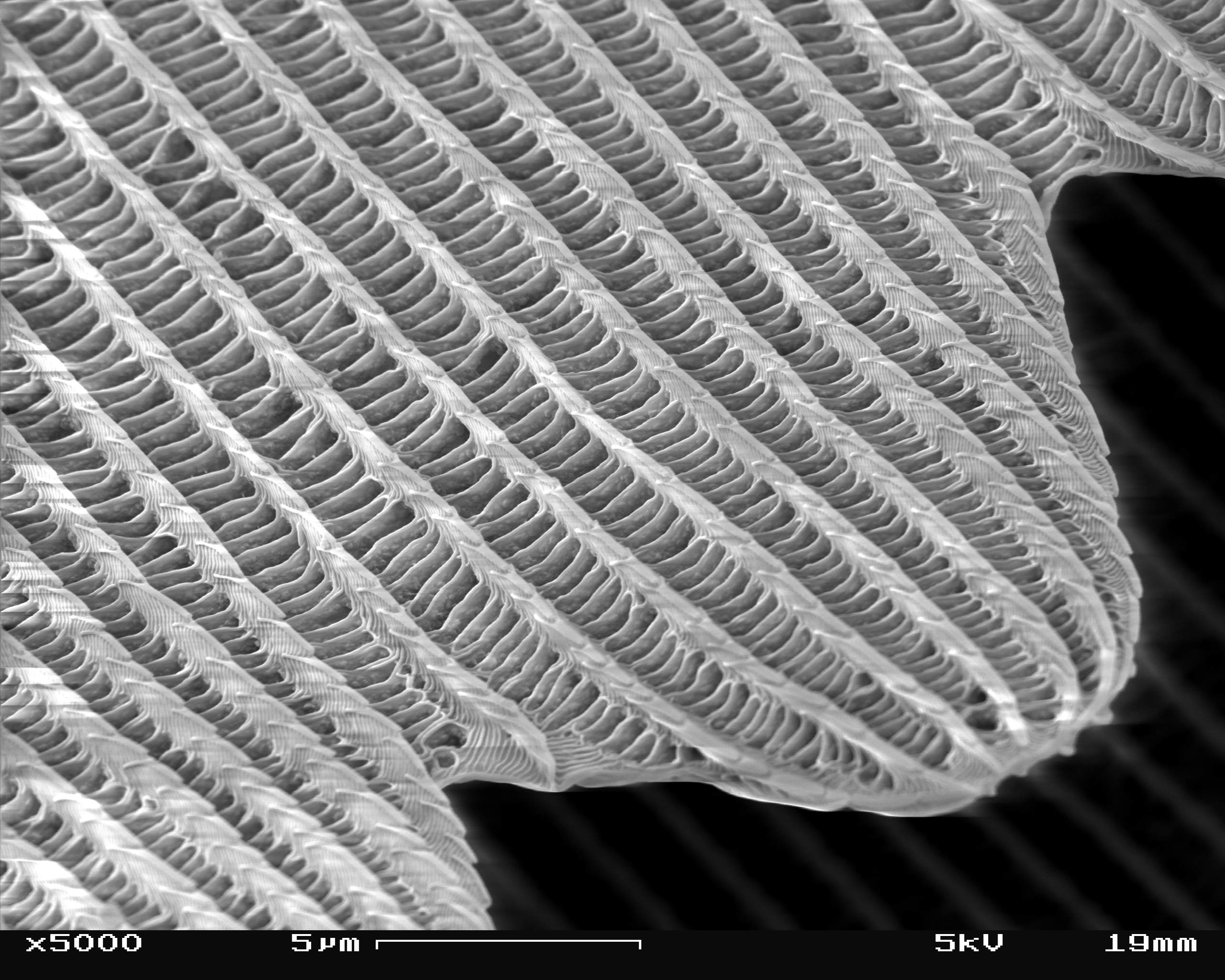
SEM micrograph of a butterfly wing scale (× 5000)

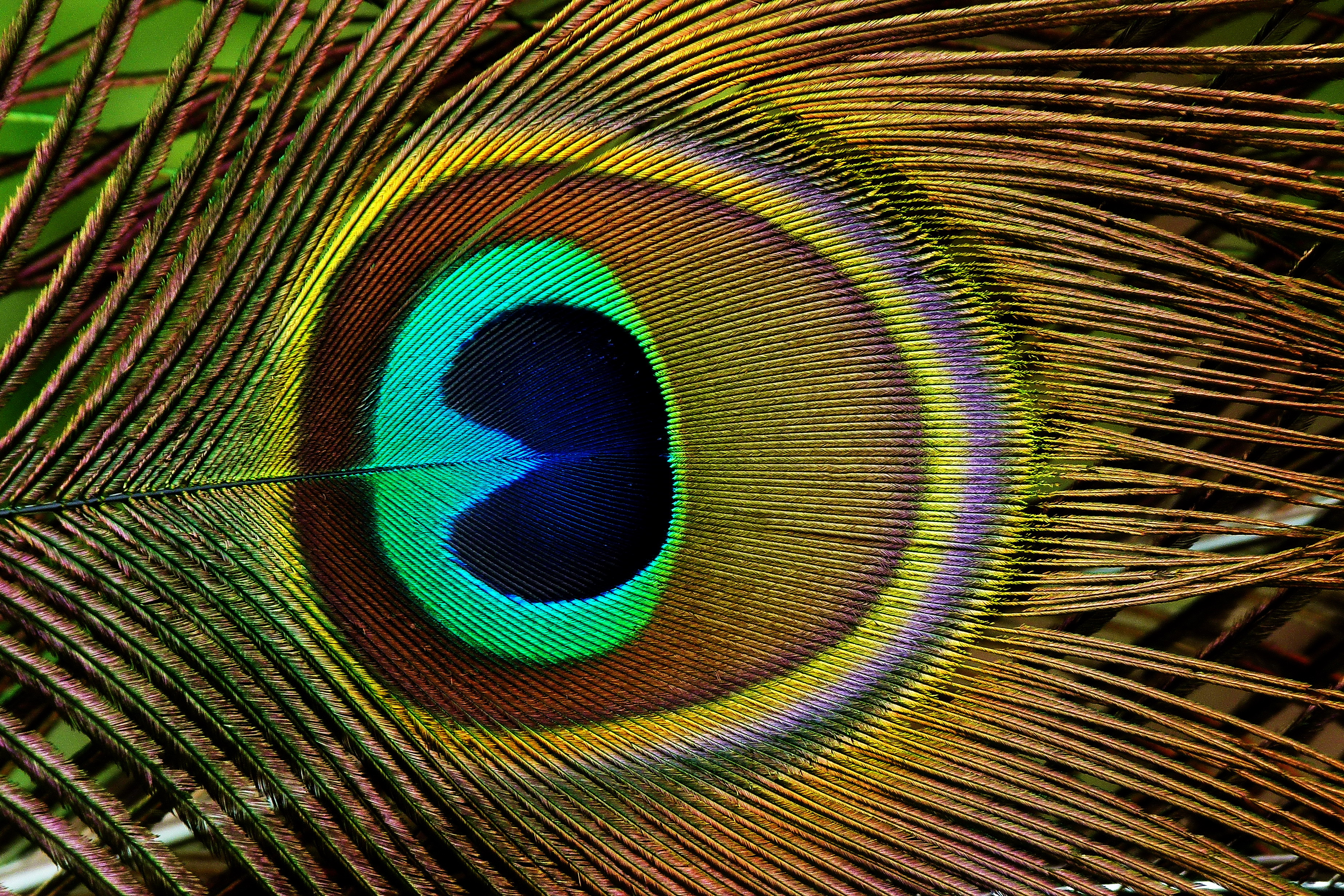
Peacock feather (detail)

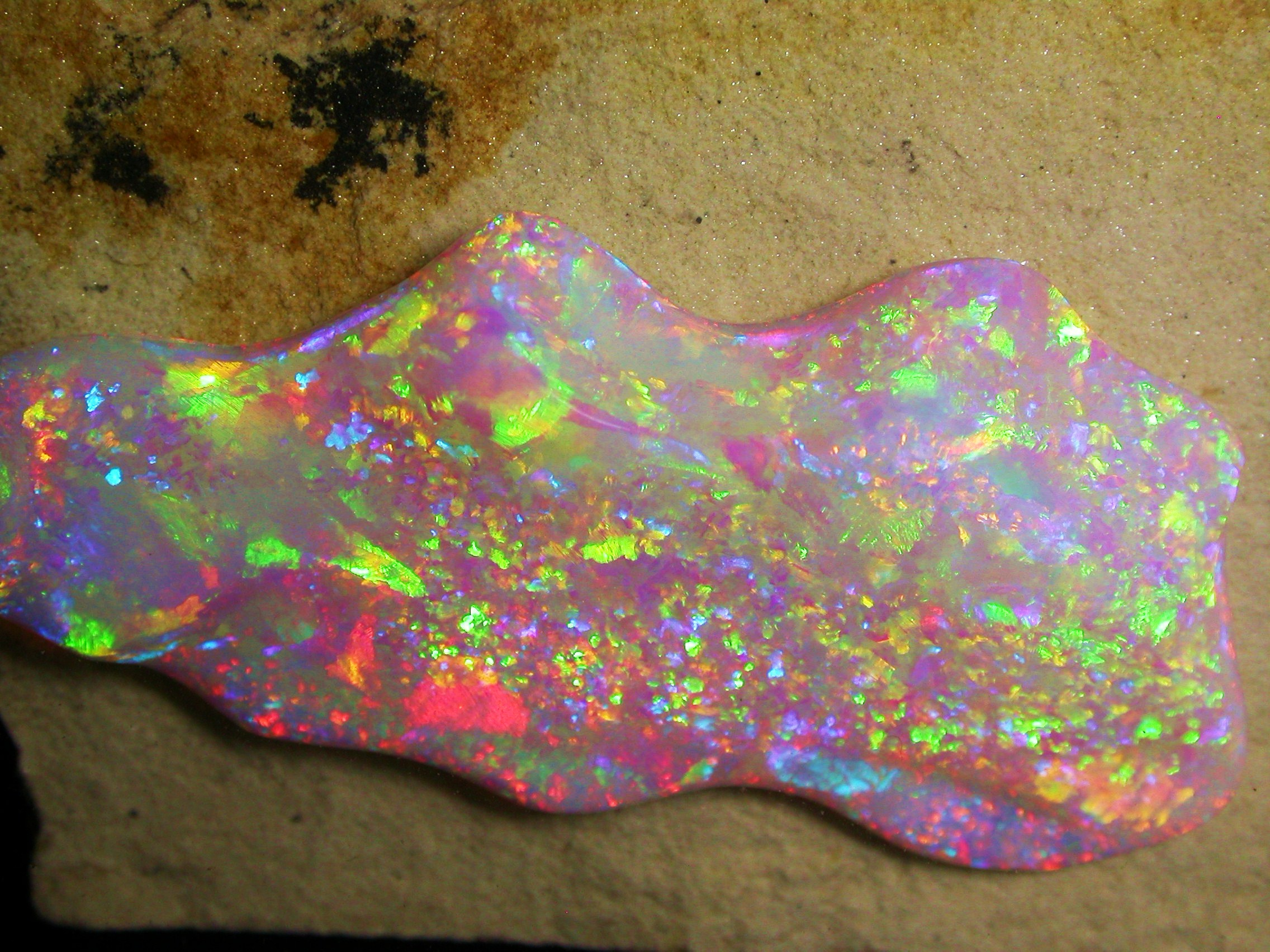
Brazilian Crystal Opal. The play of color is caused by the interference and diffraction of light between silica spheres (150–300 nm in diameter).

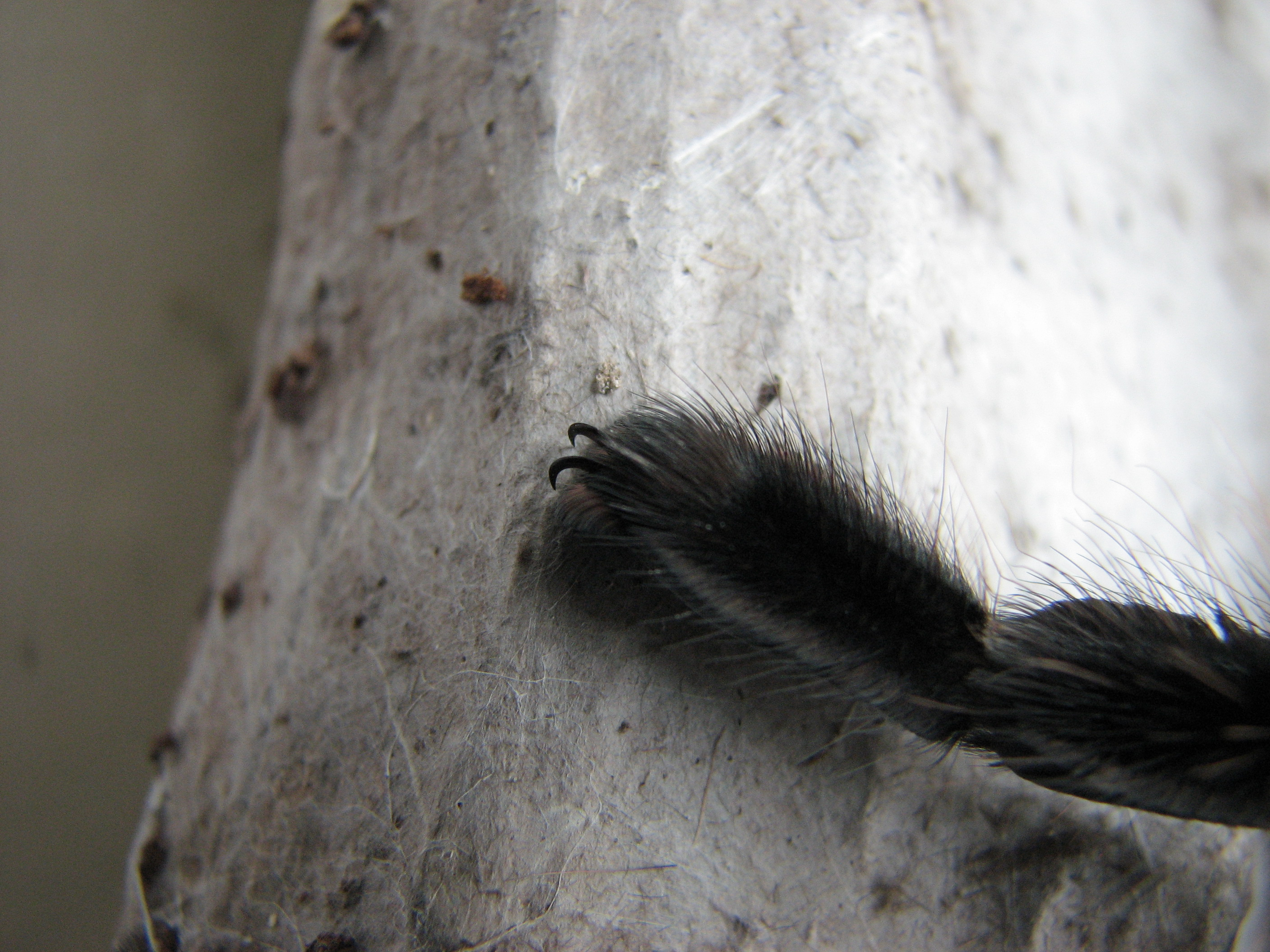
Blue hue of a species of tarantula (450 nm ± 20 nm)

== Types ==
Nano-materials are often categorized as to how many of their dimensions fall in the nanoscale. A nanoparticle is defined a nano-object with all three external dimensions in the nanoscale, whose longest and the shortest axes do not differ significantly. A nanofiber has two external dimensions in the nanoscale, with nanotubes being hollow nanofibers and nanorods being solid nanofibers. A nanoplate/nanosheet has one external dimension in the nanoscale, and if the two larger dimensions are significantly different it is called a nanoribbon. For nanofibers and nanoplates, the other dimensions may or may not be in the nanoscale, but must be significantly larger. In all of these cases, a significant difference is noted to typically be at least a factor of 3.

Nanostructured materials are often categorized by what phases of matter they contain. A nanocomposite is a solid containing at least one physically or chemically distinct region or collection of regions, having at least one dimension in the nanoscale. A nanofoam has a liquid or solid matrix, filled with a gaseous phase, where one of the two phases has dimensions on the nanoscale. A nanoporous material is a solid material containing nanopores, voids in the form of open or closed pores of sub-micron lengthscales. A nanocrystalline material has a significant fraction of crystal grains in the nanoscale.

=== Nanoporous materials ===
The term nanoporous materials contain subsets of microporous and mesoporous materials. Microporous materials are porous materials with a mean pore size smaller than 2 nm, while mesoporous materials are those with pores sizes in the region 2–50 nm. Microporous materials exhibit pore sizes with comparable length-scale to small molecules. For this reason such materials may serve valuable applications including separation membranes. Mesoporous materials are interesting towards applications that require high specific surface areas, while enabling penetration for molecules that may be too large to enter the pores of a microporous material. In some sources, nanoporous materials and nanofoam are sometimes considered nanostructures but not nanomaterials because only the voids and not the materials themselves are nanoscale. Although the ISO definition only considers round nano-objects to be nanoparticles, other sources use the term nanoparticle for all shapes.

=== Nanoparticles ===
Nanoparticles have all three dimensions on the nanoscale. Nanoparticles can also be embedded in a bulk solid to form a nanocomposite.

==== Fullerenes ====
The fullerenes are a class of allotropes of carbon which conceptually are graphene sheets rolled into tubes or spheres. These include the carbon nanotubes (or silicon nanotubes) which are of interest both because of their mechanical strength and also because of their electrical properties.

Rotating view of C_{60}, one kind of fullerene

The first fullerene molecule to be discovered, and the family's namesake, buckminsterfullerene (C_{60}), was prepared in 1985 by Richard Smalley, Robert Curl, James Heath, Sean O'Brien, and Harold Kroto at Rice University. The name was a homage to Buckminster Fuller, whose geodesic domes it resembles. Fullerenes have since been found to occur in nature. More recently, fullerenes have been detected in outer space.

For the past decade, the chemical and physical properties of fullerenes have been a hot topic in the field of research and development, and are likely to continue to be for a long time. In April 2003, fullerenes were under study for potential medicinal use: binding specific antibiotics to the structure of resistant bacteria and even target certain types of cancer cells such as melanoma. The October 2005 issue of Chemistry and Biology contains an article describing the use of fullerenes as light-activated antimicrobial agents. In the field of nanotechnology, heat resistance and superconductivity are among the properties attracting intense research.

A common method used to produce fullerenes is to send a large current between two nearby graphite electrodes in an inert atmosphere. The resulting carbon plasma arc between the electrodes cools into sooty residue from which many fullerenes can be isolated.

There are many calculations that have been done using ab-initio Quantum Methods applied to fullerenes. By DFT and TDDFT methods one can obtain IR, Raman, and UV spectra. Results of such calculations can be compared with experimental results.

==== Metal-based nanoparticles ====
Inorganic nanomaterials, (e.g. quantum dots, nanowires, and nanorods) because of their interesting optical and electrical properties, could be used in optoelectronics. Furthermore, the optical and electronic properties of nanomaterials which depend on their size and shape can be tuned via synthetic techniques. There are the possibilities to use those materials in organic material based optoelectronic devices such as organic solar cells, OLEDs etc. The operating principles of such devices are governed by photoinduced processes like electron transfer and energy transfer. The performance of the devices depends on the efficiency of the photoinduced process responsible for their functioning. Therefore, better understanding of those photoinduced processes in organic/inorganic nanomaterial composite systems is necessary in order to use them in optoelectronic devices.

Nanoparticles or nanocrystals made of metals, semiconductors, or oxides are of particular interest for their mechanical, electrical, magnetic, optical, chemical and other properties. Nanoparticles have been used as quantum dots and as chemical catalysts such as nanomaterial-based catalysts. Recently, a range of nanoparticles are extensively investigated for biomedical applications including tissue engineering, drug delivery, biosensor.

Nanoparticles are of great scientific interest as they are effectively a bridge between bulk materials and atomic or molecular structures. A bulk material should have constant physical properties regardless of its size, but at the nano-scale this is often not the case. Size-dependent properties are observed such as quantum confinement in semiconductor particles, surface plasmon resonance in some metal particles, and superparamagnetism in magnetic materials.

Nanoparticles exhibit a number of special properties relative to bulk material. For example, the bending of bulk copper (wire, ribbon, etc.) occurs with movement of copper atoms/clusters at about the 50 nm scale. Copper nanoparticles smaller than 50 nm are considered super hard materials that do not exhibit the same malleability and ductility as bulk copper. The change in properties is not always desirable. Ferroelectric materials smaller than 10 nm can switch their polarization direction using room temperature thermal energy, thus making them useless for memory storage. Suspensions of nanoparticles are possible because the interaction of the particle surface with the solvent is strong enough to overcome differences in density, which usually result in a material either sinking or floating in a liquid. Nanoparticles often have unexpected visual properties because they are small enough to confine their electrons and produce quantum effects. For example, gold nanoparticles appear deep red to black in solution.

The often very high surface area to volume ratio of nanoparticles provides a tremendous driving force for diffusion, especially at elevated temperatures. Sintering is possible at lower temperatures and over shorter durations than for larger particles. This theoretically does not affect the density of the final product, though flow difficulties and the tendency of nanoparticles to agglomerate do complicate matters. The surface effects of nanoparticles also reduces the incipient melting temperature.

=== One-dimensional nanostructures ===
The smallest possible crystalline wires with cross-section as small as a single atom can be engineered in cylindrical confinement. Carbon nanotubes, a natural semi-1D nanostructure, can be used as a template for synthesis. Confinement provides mechanical stabilization and prevents linear atomic chains from disintegration; other structures of 1D nanowires are predicted to be mechanically stable even upon isolation from the templates.

=== Two-dimensional nanostructures ===
2D materials are crystalline materials consisting of a two-dimensional single layer of atoms. The most important representative graphene was discovered in 2004. Thin films with nanoscale thicknesses (nanofilms) are considered nanostructures, but are sometimes not considered nanomaterials because they do not exist separately from the substrate. 2D materials have expanded past graphene with the development of hexagonal boron nitride, 2D conductive metal−organic frameworks, dichalcogenide and layered metal oxides.

=== Bulk nanostructured materials ===
Some bulk materials contain features on the nanoscale, including nanocomposites, nanocrystalline materials, nanostructured films, and nanotextured surfaces.

Box-shaped graphene (BSG) nanostructure is an example of 3D nanomaterial. BSG nanostructure has appeared after mechanical cleavage of pyrolytic graphite. This nanostructure is a multilayer system of parallel hollow nanochannels located along the surface and having quadrangular cross-section. The thickness of the channel walls is approximately equal to 1 nm. The typical width of channel facets makes about 25 nm.

== Applications ==
Nanomaterials are used in a variety of, manufacturing processes, products and healthcare including paints, filters, insulation and lubricant additives. In healthcare Nanozymes are nanomaterials with enzyme-like characteristics. They are an emerging type of artificial enzyme, which have been used for wide applications in such as biosensing, bioimaging, tumor diagnosis, antibiofouling and more. High quality filters may be produced using nanostructures, these filters are capable of removing particulate as small as a virus as seen in a water filter created by Seldon Technologies. Nanomaterials membrane bioreactor (NMs-MBR), the next generation of conventional MBR, are recently proposed for the advanced treatment of wastewater. In the air purification field, nano technology was used to combat the spread of MERS in Saudi Arabian hospitals in 2012. Nanomaterials are being used in modern and human-safe insulation technologies; in the past they were found in Asbestos-based insulation. As a lubricant additive, nanomaterials have the ability to reduce friction in moving parts. Worn and corroded parts can also be repaired with self-assembling anisotropic nanoparticles called TriboTEX. Nanomaterials have also been applied in a range of industries and consumer products. Mineral nanoparticles such as titanium-oxide have been used to improve UV protection in sunscreen. In the sports industry, lighter bats to have been produced with carbon nanotubes to improve performance. Another application is in the military, where mobile pigment nanoparticles have been used to create more effective camouflage. Nanomaterials can also be used in three-way-catalyst applications, which have the advantage of controlling the emission of nitrogen oxides (NO_{x}), which are precursors to acid rain and smog. In core-shell structure, nanomaterials form shell as the catalyst support to protect the noble metals such as palladium and rhodium. The primary function is that the supports can be used for carrying catalysts active components, making them highly dispersed, reducing the use of noble metals, enhancing catalysts activity, and potentially improving the stability.

== Synthesis ==
The goal of any synthetic method for nanomaterials is to yield a material that exhibits properties that are a result of their characteristic length scale being in the nanometer range (1 – 100 nm). Accordingly, the synthetic method should exhibit control of size in this range so that one property or another can be attained. Often the methods are divided into two main types, "bottom up" and "top down".

=== Bottom-up methods ===
Bottom-up methods involve the assembly of atoms or molecules into nanostructured arrays. In these methods the raw material sources can be in the form of gases, liquids, or solids. The latter require some sort of disassembly prior to their incorporation onto a nanostructure. Bottom up methods generally fall into two categories: chaotic and controlled.

Chaotic processes involve elevating the constituent atoms or molecules to a chaotic state and then suddenly changing the conditions so as to make that state unstable. Through the clever manipulation of any number of parameters, products form largely as a result of the insuring kinetics. The collapse from the chaotic state can be difficult or impossible to control and so ensemble statistics often govern the resulting size distribution and average size. Accordingly, nanoparticle formation is controlled through manipulation of the end state of the products. Examples of chaotic processes are laser ablation, exploding wire, arc, flame pyrolysis, combustion, and precipitation synthesis techniques.

Controlled processes involve the controlled delivery of the constituent atoms or molecules to the site(s) of nanoparticle formation such that the nanoparticle can grow to a prescribed sizes in a controlled manner. Generally the state of the constituent atoms or molecules are never far from that needed for nanoparticle formation. Accordingly, nanoparticle formation is controlled through the control of the state of the reactants. Examples of controlled processes are self-limiting growth solution, self-limited chemical vapor deposition, shaped pulse femtosecond laser techniques, plant and microbial approaches and molecular beam epitaxy.

=== Top-down methods ===
Top-down methods adopt some 'force' (e. g. mechanical force, laser) to break bulk materials into nanoparticles. A popular method involves mechanical break apart bulk materials into nanomaterials is 'ball milling'. Besides that, nanoparticles can also be made by laser ablation which apply short pulse lasers (e. g. femtosecond laser) to ablate a target (solid).

== Characterization ==
Novel effects can occur in materials when structures are formed with sizes comparable to any one of many possible length scales, such as the de Broglie wavelength of electrons, or the optical wavelengths of high energy photons. In these cases quantum mechanical effects can dominate material properties. One example is quantum confinement where the electronic properties of solids are altered with great reductions in particle size. The optical properties of nanoparticles, e.g. fluorescence, also become a function of the particle diameter. This effect does not come into play by going from macrosocopic to micrometer dimensions, but becomes pronounced when the nanometer scale is reached.

In addition to optical and electronic properties, the novel mechanical properties of many nanomaterials is the subject of nanomechanics research. When added to a bulk material, nanoparticles can strongly influence the mechanical properties of the material, such as the stiffness or elasticity. For example, traditional polymers can be reinforced by nanoparticles (such as carbon nanotubes) resulting in novel materials which can be used as lightweight replacements for metals. Such composite materials may enable a weight reduction accompanied by an increase in stability and improved functionality.

Finally, nanostructured materials with small particle size, such as zeolites and asbestos, are used as catalysts in a wide range of critical industrial chemical reactions. The further development of such catalysts can form the basis of more efficient, environmentally friendly chemical processes.

The first observations and size measurements of nano-particles were made during the first decade of the 20th century. Zsigmondy made detailed studies of gold sols and other nanomaterials with sizes down to 10 nm and less. He published a book in 1914. He used an ultramicroscope that employs a dark field method for seeing particles with sizes much less than light wavelength.

There are traditional techniques developed during the 20th century in interface and colloid science for characterizing nanomaterials. These are widely used for first generation passive nanomaterials specified in the next section.

These methods include several different techniques for characterizing particle size distribution. This characterization is imperative because many materials that are expected to be nano-sized are actually aggregated in solutions. Some of methods are based on light scattering. Others apply ultrasound, such as ultrasound attenuation spectroscopy for testing concentrated nano-dispersions and microemulsions.

There is also a group of traditional techniques for characterizing surface charge or zeta potential of nano-particles in solutions. This information is required for proper system stabilization, preventing its aggregation or flocculation. These methods include microelectrophoresis, electrophoretic light scattering, and electroacoustics. The last one, for instance colloid vibration current method is suitable for characterizing concentrated systems.

== Mechanical properties ==
The ongoing research has shown that mechanical properties can vary significantly in nanomaterials compared to bulk material. Nanomaterials have substantial mechanical properties due to the volume, surface, and quantum effects of nanoparticles. This is observed when the nanoparticles are added to common bulk material, the nanomaterial refines the grain and forms intergranular and intragranular structures which improve the grain boundaries and therefore the mechanical properties of the materials. Grain boundary refinements provide strengthening by increasing the stress required to cause intergranular or transgranular fractures. A common example where this can be observed is the addition of nano Silica to cement, which improves the tensile strength, compressive strength, and bending strength by the mechanisms just mentioned. The understanding of these properties will enhance the use of nanoparticles in novel applications in various fields such as surface engineering, tribology, nanomanufacturing, and nanofabrication.

Techniques used:

Steinitz in 1943 used the micro-indentation technique to test the hardness of microparticles, and now nanoindentation has been employed to measure elastic properties of particles at about 5-micron level. These protocols are frequently used to calculate the mechanical characteristics of nanoparticles via atomic force microscopy (AFM) techniques. To measure the elastic modulus; indentation data is obtained via AFM force-displacement curves being converted to force-indentation curves. Hooke's law is used to determine the cantilever deformation and depth of the tip, and in conclusion, the pressure equation can be written as:

$P=k(\delta_{c}-\delta_{c0})$

$\delta_{c}$: cantilever deformation

$\delta_{c0}$: deflection offset

AFM allows us to obtain a high-resolution image of multiple types of surfaces while the tip of the cantilever can be used to obtain information about mechanical properties. Computer simulations are also being progressively used to test theories and complement experimental studies. The most used computer method is molecular dynamics simulation, which uses Newton's equations of motion for the atoms or molecules in the system. Other techniques such direct probe method are used to determine the adhesive properties of nanomaterials. Both the technique and simulation are coupled with transmission electron microscope (TEM) and AFM techniques to provide results.

Mechanical properties of common nanomaterials classes:

Crystalline metal nanomaterials: Dislocations are one of the major contributors toward elastic properties within nanomaterials similar to bulk crystalline materials. Despite the traditional view of there being no dislocations in nanomaterials. Ramos, experimental work has shown that the hardness of gold nanoparticles is much higher than their bulk counterparts, as there are stacking faults and dislocations forming that activate multiple strengthening mechanisms in the material. Through these experiments, more research has shown that via nanoindentation techniques, material strength; compressive stress, increases under compression with decreasing particle size, because of nucleating dislocations. These dislocations have been observed using TEM techniques, coupled with nanoindentation. Silicon nanoparticles strength and hardness are four times more than the value of the bulk material. The resistance to pressure applied can be attributed to the line defects inside the particles as well as a dislocation that provides strengthening of the mechanical properties of the nanomaterial. Furthermore, the addition of nanoparticles strengthens a matrix because the pinning of particles inhibits grain growth. This refines the grain, and hence improves the mechanical properties. However, not all additions of nanomaterials lead to an increase in properties for example nano-Cu. But this is attributed to the inherent properties of the material being weaker than the matrix.

Nonmetallic nanoparticles and nanomaterials: Size-dependent behavior of mechanical properties is still not clear in the case of polymer nanomaterials however, in one research by Lahouij they found that the compressive moduli of polystyrene nanoparticles were found to be less than that of the bulk counterparts. This can be associated with the functional groups being hydrated. Furthermore, nonmetallic nanomaterials can lead to agglomerates forming inside the matrix they are being added to and hence decrease the mechanical properties by leading to fracture under even low mechanical loads, such as the addition of CNTs. The agglomerates will act as slip planes as well as planes in which cracks can easily propagate (9). However, most organic nanomaterials are flexible and these and the mechanical properties such as hardness etc. are not dominant.

Nanowires and nanotubes: The elastic moduli of some nanowires namely lead and silver, decrease with increasing diameter. This has been associated with surface stress, oxidation layer, and surface roughness. However, the elastic behavior of ZnO nanowires does not get affected by surface effects but their fracture properties do. So, it is generally dependent on material behavior and their bonding as well.

The reason why mechanical properties of nanomaterials are still a hot topic for research is that measuring the mechanical properties of individual nanoparticles is a complicated method, involving multiple control factors. Nonetheless, Atomic force microscopy has been widely used to measure the mechanical properties of nanomaterials.

Adhesion and friction of nanoparticles

When talking about the application of a material adhesion and friction play a critical role in determining the outcome of the application. Therefore, it is critical to see how these properties also get affected by the size of a material. Again, AFM is a technique most used to measure these properties and to determine the adhesive strength of nanoparticles to any solid surface, along with the colloidal probe technique and other chemical properties. Furthermore, the forces playing a role in providing these adhesive properties to nanomaterials are either the electrostatic forces, VdW, capillary forces, solvation forces, structure force, etc. It has been found that the addition of nanomaterials in bulk materials substantially increases their adhesive capabilities by increasing their strength through various bonding mechanisms. Nanomaterials dimension approaches zero, which means that the fraction of the particle's surface to overall atoms increases.

Along with surface effects, the movement of nanoparticles also plays a role in dictating their mechanical properties such as shearing capabilities. The movement of particles can be observed under TEM. For example, the movement behavior of MoS2 nanoparticles dynamic contact was directly observed in situ which led to the conclusion that fullerenes can shear via rolling or sliding. However, observing these properties is again a very complicated process due to multiple contributing factors.

Applications specific to Mechanical Properties:

- Lubrication
- Nano-manufacturing
- Coatings

== Uniformity ==
The chemical processing and synthesis of high performance technological components for the private, industrial and military sectors requires the use of high purity ceramics, polymera, glass-ceramics, and composite materials. In condensed bodies formed from fine powders, the irregular sizes and shapes of nanoparticles in a typical powder often lead to non-uniform packing morphologies that result in packing density variations in the powder compact.

Uncontrolled agglomeration of powders due to attractive van der Waals forces can also give rise to in microstructural inhomogeneities. Differential stresses that develop as a result of non-uniform drying shrinkage are directly related to the rate at which the solvent can be removed, and thus highly dependent upon the distribution of porosity. Such stresses have been associated with a plastic-to-brittle transition in consolidated bodies, and can yield to crack propagation in the unfired body if not relieved.

In addition, any fluctuations in packing density in the compact as it is prepared for the kiln are often amplified during the sintering process, yielding inhomogeneous densification. Some pores and other structural defects associated with density variations have been shown to play a detrimental role in the sintering process by growing and thus limiting end-point densities. Differential stresses arising from inhomogeneous densification have also been shown to result in the propagation of internal cracks, thus becoming the strength-controlling flaws.

It would therefore appear desirable to process a material in such a way that it is physically uniform with regard to the distribution of components and porosity, rather than using particle size distributions which will maximize the green density. The containment of a uniformly dispersed assembly of strongly interacting particles in suspension requires total control over particle-particle interactions. A number of dispersants such as ammonium citrate (aqueous) and imidazoline or oleyl alcohol (nonaqueous) are promising solutions as possible additives for enhanced dispersion and deagglomeration. Monodisperse nanoparticles and colloids provide this potential.

Monodisperse powders of colloidal silica, for example, may therefore be stabilized sufficiently to ensure a high degree of order in the colloidal crystal or polycrystalline colloidal solid which results from aggregation. The degree of order appears to be limited by the time and space allowed for longer-range correlations to be established. Such defective polycrystalline colloidal structures would appear to be the basic elements of sub-micrometer colloidal materials science, and, therefore, provide the first step in developing a more rigorous understanding of the mechanisms involved in microstructural evolution in high performance materials and components.

== Nanomaterials in articles, patents, and products ==
The quantitative analysis of nanomaterials showed that nanoparticles, nanotubes, nanocrystalline materials, nanocomposites, and graphene have been mentioned in 400,000, 181,000, 144,000, 140,000, and 119,000 ISI-indexed articles, respectively, by September 2018. As far as patents are concerned, nanoparticles, nanotubes, nanocomposites, graphene, and nanowires have been played a role in 45,600, 32,100, 12,700, 12,500, and 11,800 patents, respectively. Monitoring approximately 7,000 commercial nano-based products available on global markets revealed that the properties of around 2,330 products have been enabled or enhanced aided by nanoparticles. Liposomes, nanofibers, nanocolloids, and aerogels were also of the most common nanomaterials in consumer products.

The European Union Observatory for Nanomaterials (EUON) has produced a database (NanoData) that provides information on specific patents, products, and research publications on nanomaterials.

== Health and safety ==
=== World Health Organization guidelines ===
The World Health Organization (WHO) published a guideline on protecting workers from potential risk of manufactured nanomaterials at the end of 2017. WHO used a precautionary approach as one of its guiding principles. This means that exposure has to be reduced, despite uncertainty about the adverse health effects, when there are reasonable indications to do so. This is highlighted by recent scientific studies that demonstrate a capability of nanoparticles to cross cell barriers and interact with cellular structures. In addition, the hierarchy of controls was an important guiding principle. This means that when there is a choice between control measures, those measures that are closer to the root of the problem should always be preferred over measures that put a greater burden on workers, such as the use of personal protective equipment (PPE). WHO commissioned systematic reviews for all important issues to assess the current state of the science and to inform the recommendations according to the process set out in the WHO Handbook for guideline development. The recommendations were rated as "strong" or "conditional" depending on the quality of the scientific evidence, values and preferences, and costs related to the recommendation.

The WHO guidelines contain the following recommendations for safe handling of manufactured nanomaterials (MNMs)

A. Assess health hazards of MNMs

1. WHO recommends assigning hazard classes to all MNMs according to the Globally Harmonized System (GHS) of Classification and Labelling of Chemicals for use in safety data sheets. For a limited number of MNMs this information is made available in the guidelines (strong recommendation, moderate-quality evidence).
2. WHO recommends updating safety data sheets with MNM-specific hazard information or indicating which toxicological end-points did not have adequate testing available (strong recommendation, moderate-quality evidence).
3. For the respirable fibres and granular biopersistent particles' groups, the GDG suggests using the available classification of MNMs for provisional classification of nanomaterials of the same group (conditional recommendation, low-quality evidence).

B. Assess exposure to MNMs

1. WHO suggests assessing workers' exposure in workplaces with methods similar to those used for the proposed specific occupational exposure limit (OEL) value of the MNM (conditional recommendation, low-quality evidence).
2. Because there are no specific regulatory OEL values for MNMs in workplaces, WHO suggests assessing whether workplace exposure exceeds a proposed OEL value for the MNM. A list of proposed OEL values is provided in an annex of the guidelines. The chosen OEL should be at least as protective as a legally mandated OEL for the bulk form of the material (conditional recommendation, low-quality evidence).
3. If specific OELs for MNMs are not available in workplaces, WHO suggests a step-wise approach for inhalation exposure with, first an assessment of the potential for exposure; second, conducting basic exposure assessment and third, conducting a comprehensive exposure assessment such as those proposed by the Organisation for Economic Cooperation and Development (OECD) or Comité Européen de Normalisation (the European Committee for Standardization, CEN) (conditional recommendation, moderate quality evidence).
4. For dermal exposure assessment, WHO found that there was insufficient evidence to recommend one method of dermal exposure assessment over another.

C. Control exposure to MNMs

1. Based on a precautionary approach, WHO recommends focusing control of exposure on preventing inhalation exposure with the aim of reducing it as much as possible (strong recommendation, moderate-quality evidence).
2. WHO recommends reduction of exposures to a range of MNMs that have been consistently measured in workplaces especially during cleaning and maintenance, collecting material from reaction vessels and feeding MNMs into the production process. In the absence of toxicological information, WHO recommends implementing the highest level of controls to prevent workers from any exposure. When more information is available, WHO recommends taking a more tailored approach (strong recommendation, moderate-quality evidence).
3. WHO recommends taking control measures based on the principle of hierarchy of controls, meaning that the first control measure should be to eliminate the source of exposure before implementing control measures that are more dependent on worker involvement, with PPE being used only as a last resort. According to this principle, engineering controls should be used when there is a high level of inhalation exposure or when there is no, or very little, toxicological information available. In the absence of appropriate engineering controls PPE should be used, especially respiratory protection, as part of a respiratory protection programme that includes fit-testing (strong recommendation, moderate-quality evidence).
4. WHO suggests preventing dermal exposure by occupational hygiene measures such as surface cleaning, and the use of appropriate gloves (conditional recommendation, low quality evidence).
5. When assessment and measurement by a workplace safety expert is not available, WHO suggests using control banding for nanomaterials to select exposure control measures in the workplace. Owing to a lack of studies, WHO cannot recommend one method of control banding over another (conditional recommendation, very low-quality evidence).

For health surveillance WHO could not make a recommendation for targeted MNM-specific health surveillance programmes over existing health surveillance programmes that are already in use owing to the lack of evidence. WHO considers training of workers and worker involvement in health and safety issues to be best practice but could not recommend one form of training of workers over another, or one form of worker involvement over another, owing to the lack of studies available. It is expected that there will be considerable progress in validated measurement methods and risk assessment and WHO expects to update these guidelines in five years' time, in 2022.

=== Other guidance ===
Because nanotechnology is a recent development, the health and safety effects of exposures to nanomaterials, and what levels of exposure may be acceptable, are subjects of ongoing research. Of the possible hazards, inhalation exposure appears to present the most concern. Animal studies indicate that carbon nanotubes and carbon nanofibers can cause pulmonary effects including inflammation, granulomas, and pulmonary fibrosis, which were of similar or greater potency when compared with other known fibrogenic materials such as silica, asbestos, and ultrafine carbon black. Acute inhalation exposure of healthy animals to biodegradable inorganic nanomaterials have not demonstrated significant toxicity effects. Although the extent to which animal data may predict clinically significant lung effects in workers is not known, the toxicity seen in the short-term animal studies indicate a need for protective action for workers exposed to these nanomaterials, although no reports of actual adverse health effects in workers using or producing these nanomaterials were known as of 2013. Additional concerns include skin contact and ingestion exposure, and dust explosion hazards.

Elimination and substitution are the most desirable approaches to hazard control. While the nanomaterials themselves often cannot be eliminated or substituted with conventional materials, it may be possible to choose properties of the nanoparticle such as size, shape, functionalization, surface charge, solubility, agglomeration, and aggregation state to improve their toxicological properties while retaining the desired functionality. Handling procedures can also be improved, for example, using a nanomaterial slurry or suspension in a liquid solvent instead of a dry powder will reduce dust exposure. Engineering controls are physical changes to the workplace that isolate workers from hazards, mainly ventilation systems such as fume hoods, gloveboxes, biosafety cabinets, and vented balance enclosures. Administrative controls are changes to workers' behavior to mitigate a hazard, including training on best practices for safe handling, storage, and disposal of nanomaterials, proper awareness of hazards through labeling and warning signage, and encouraging a general safety culture. Personal protective equipment must be worn on the worker's body and is the least desirable option for controlling hazards. Personal protective equipment normally used for typical chemicals are also appropriate for nanomaterials, including long pants, long-sleeve shirts, and closed-toed shoes, and the use of safety gloves, goggles, and impervious laboratory coats. In some circumstances respirators may be used.

Exposure assessment is a set of methods used to monitor contaminant release and exposures to workers. These methods include personal sampling, where samplers are located in the personal breathing zone of the worker, often attached to a shirt collar to be as close to the nose and mouth as possible; and area/background sampling, where they are placed at static locations. The assessment should use both particle counters, which monitor the real-time quantity of nanomaterials and other background particles; and filter-based samples, which can be used to identify the nanomaterial, usually using electron microscopy and elemental analysis. As of 2016, quantitative occupational exposure limits have not been determined for most nanomaterials. The U.S. National Institute for Occupational Safety and Health has determined non-regulatory recommended exposure limits for carbon nanotubes, carbon nanofibers, and ultrafine titanium dioxide. Agencies and organizations from other countries, including the British Standards Institute and the Institute for Occupational Safety and Health in Germany, have established OELs for some nanomaterials, and some companies have supplied OELs for their products.

Nanoscale diagnostics

Nanotechnology has been making headlines in the medical field, being responsible for biomedical imaging. The unique optical, magnetic and chemical properties of materials on the Nano scale has allowed the development of imaging probes with multi-functionality such as better contrast enhancement, better spatial information, controlled bio distribution, and multi-modal imaging across various scanning devices. These developments have had advantages such as being able to detect the location of tumors and inflammations, accurate assessment of disease progression, and personalized medicine.

1. Silica nanoparticles- Silica nanoparticles can be classified into solid, non-porous, and mesoporous. They have large surface are, hydrophilic surface, and chemical and physical stabilities. Silica nanoparticles are made by the use of the Stöber process. Which is the hydrolysis of silyl ethers such as tetraethyl silicate into silanols (Si-OH) using ammonia in a mixture of water and alcohol followed by the condensation of silanols into 50–2000 nm silica particles. The size of the particle can be controlled by varying the concentration of silyl ether and alcohol or the micro emulsion method. Mesoporous silica nanoparticles are synthesized by the sol-gel process. They have pores that range in diameter from 2 nm to 50 nm. They are synthesized in a water-based solution in the presence of a base catalyst and a pore forming agent known as a surfactant. Surfactants are molecules that present the particularity to have a hydrophobic tail (alkyl chain) and a hydrophilic head (charged group, such as a quaternary amine for example). As these surfactants are added to a water-based solution, they will coordinate to form micelles with increasing concentration in order to stabilize the hydrophobic tails. Varying the pH of the solution and composition of the solvents, and the addition of certain swelling agents can control the pore size. Their hydrophilic surface is what makes silica nanoparticles so important and allows them to carry out functions such as drug and gene delivery, bio imaging and therapy. In order for this application to be successful, assorted surface functional groups are necessary and can be added either by the co-condensation process during preparation or by post surface modification. The high surface area of silica nanoparticles allows them to carry much larger amounts of the desired drug than through conventional methods like polymers and liposomes. It allows for site specific targeting, especially in the treatment of cancer. Once the particles have reached their destination, they can act as a reporter, release a compound, or be remotely heated to damage biological structures in close proximity. Targeting is typically accomplished by modifying the surface of the nanoparticle with a chemical or biological compound. They accumulate at tumor sites through Enhanced Permeability Retention (EPR), where the tumor vessels accelerate the delivery of the nanoparticles directly into the tumor. The porous shell of the silica allows control over the rate at which the drug diffuses out of the nanoparticle. The shell can be modified to have an affinity for the drug, or even to be triggered by pH, heat, light, salts, or other signaling molecules. Silica nanoparticles are also used in bio imaging because they can accommodate fluorescent/MRI/PET/ SPECT contrast agents and drug/DNA molecules to their adaptable surface and pores. This is made possible by using the silica nanoparticle as a vector for the expression of fluorescent proteins. Several different types of fluorescent probes, like cyanine dyes, methyl violegen, or semiconductor quantum dots can be conjugated to silica nanoparticles and delivered into specific cells or injected in vivo. Carrier molecule RGD peptide has been very useful of targeted in vivo imaging.
2. Topically applied surface-enhanced resonance Raman ratiometric spectroscopy (TAS3RS)- TAS3RS is another technique that is starting to make advancement in the medical field. It is an imaging technique that uses Folate Receptors (FR) to detect tumor lesions as small as 370 micrometers. Folate Receptors are membrane bound surface proteins that bind folates and folate conjugates with high affinity. FR is frequently overexpressed in a number of human malignancies including cancer of the ovary, lung, kidney, breast, bladder, brain, and endometrium. Raman imaging is a type of spectroscopy that is used in chemistry to provide structural fingerprint by which molecules can be identified. It relies upon inelastic scattering of photons, which result in ultra high sensitivity. There was a study that was done where two different surface enhanced resonance Raman scattering were synthesized (SERRS). One of the SERRS was a "targeted nanoprobe functionalized with an anti-folate-receptor antibody (αFR-Ab) via a PEG-maleimide-succinimide and using the infrared dye IR780 as the Raman reporter, henceforth referred to as αFR-NP, and a nontargeted probe (nt-NP) coated with PEG5000-maleimide and featuring the IR140 infrared dye as the Raman reporter." These two different mixtures were injected into tumor bearing mice and healthy controlled mice. The mice were imaged with Bioluminescence (BLI) signal that produces light energy within an organism's body. They were also scanned with the Raman microscope in order to be able to see the correlation between the TAS3RS and the BLI map. TAS3RS did not show anything in the healthy mice, but was able to locate the tumor lesions in the infected mice and also able to create a TAS3RS map that could be used as guidance during surgery. TAS3RS shows to be promising in being able to combat ovarian and peritoneal cancer as it allows early detection with high accuracy. This technique can be administered locally, which is an advantage as it does not have to enter the bloodstream and therefore bypassing the toxicity concerns circulating nanoprobes. This technique is also more photostable than fluorochromes because SERRS nanoparticles cannot form from biomolecules and therefore there would not be any false positives in TAS3RS as there is in fluorescence imaging.

== See also ==
- Nanozyme
- Directional freezing
- List of software for nanostructures modeling
- Molecular nanotopology
- Nanochemistry
- Nanostructure
- Nanotopography
