= Calbi =

Calbi is a surname. Notable people with the surname include:

- Greg Calbi (born 1949), American sound engineer
- Maria Calbi, Argentine American physicist
- Otello Calbi (1917–1995), Italian composer and musician
- Ruggero Calbi (1683–1761), Italian physician and poet
