= Nanohole =

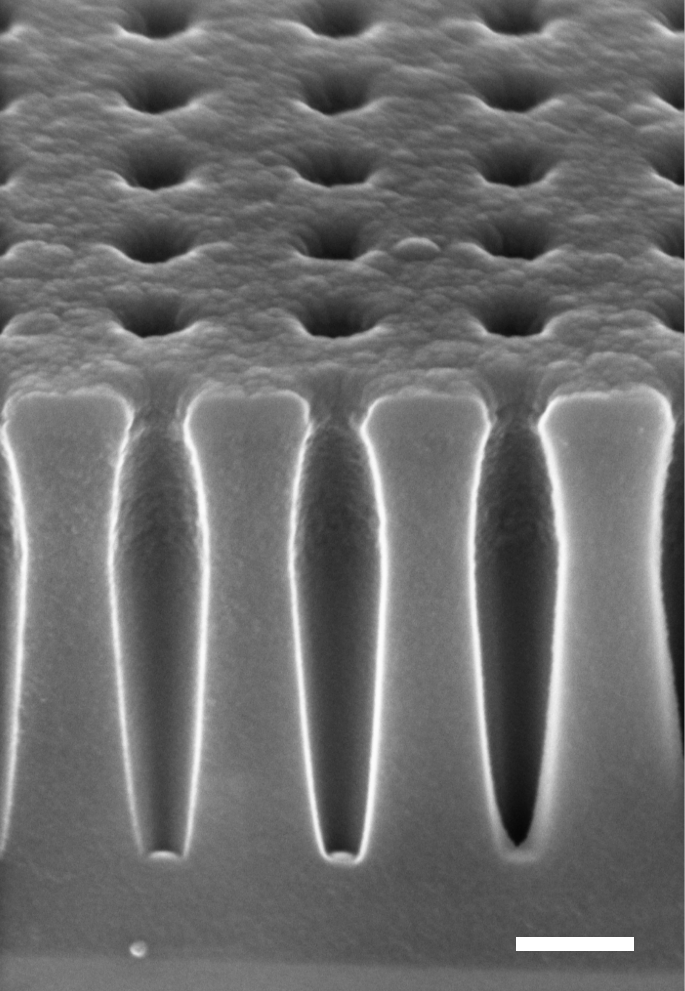
Angled cross-sectional scanning electron micrograph of a nanohole array etched in amorphous silicon, with a thin conductive polymer coating. Scale bar is 200 nm.

Nanoholes are a class of nanostructured material consisting of nanoscale voids in a surface of a material. Not to be confused with nanofoam or nanoporous materials which support a network of voids permeating throughout the material (often in a disordered state), nanohole materials feature a regular hole pattern extending through a single surface. These can be thought of as the inverse of a nanopillar or nanowire structure.

== Uses ==
Nanohole structures have been used for a variety of applications, ranging from superlenses produced from a metal nanohole array, to structured photovoltaic devices used to improve carrier extraction, and light absorption.

Nanohole structures are also extensively utilized for the creation of photonic crystals, particularly for creating photonic crystal waveguides.

== See also ==
- Nanoporous material
- Nanopore
- Nanostructures
