= ISO/TS 80004 =

The ISO/TS 80004 series of standards, from the International Organization for Standardization, describe vocabulary for nanotechnology and its applications. These were largely motivated by health, safety and environment concerns, many of them originally elaborated by Eric Drexler in his 1985 Engines of Creation and echoed in more recent research. The ISO standards simply describe vocabulary or terminology by which a number of critical discussions between members of various stakeholder communities, including the public and political leaders, can begin. Drexler, in Chapter 15 of his 1985 work, explained how such consultation and the evolution of new social media and mechanisms to make objective scientific determinations regardless of political and industrial and public pressures, would be important to the evolution of the field. Nonetheless, it took a quarter-century for the ISO to agree and eventually standardize on this terminology.

Reviews of the field often need to distinct various definitions of nanomaterials vs. mesomaterials, nanoscale objects from nanostructured materials (including nanoporous materials), and other confused terms. The intent of the ISO standards is to remove most potential for terminology clash especially when dealing with international regulatory synchronization. The standard currently consists of 11 published parts, while more parts are under preparation which addresses graphene and quantum phenomena.

ISO/TR 18401 provides plain language explanations of selected terms from the ISO 80004 series.

== The standards parts ==
- ISO/TS 80004-1:2023 Nanotechnologies—Vocabulary—Part 1: Core terms
  - basic terminology relevant to nanoscale materials
- ISO/TS 80004-2:2015 Nanotechnologies—Vocabulary—Part 2: Nano-objects
  - terms and definitions related to particles in the field of nanotechnologies. This standard cancels and replaces ISO/TS 27687:2008, which has been technically revised.
- ISO/TS 80004-3:2020 Nanotechnologies—Vocabulary—Part 3: Carbon nano-objects
  - carbon nano-objects, e.g. carbon nanotubes
- ISO/TS 80004-4:2011 Nanotechnologies—Vocabulary—Part 4: Nanostructured materials
  - terms and definitions for materials in the field of nanotechnologies where one or more components are nanoscale regions and the materials exhibit properties attributable to the presence of those nanoscale regions. A nanostructured material has an internal or surface structure with a significant fraction of features, grains, voids or precipitates in the nanoscale. Articles that contain nano-objects or nanostructured materials are not necessarily nanostructured materials themselves. ISO/TS 80004-4:2011 includes nanodispersion.
- ISO/TS 80004-5:2011 Nanotechnologies—Vocabulary—Part 5: Nano/bio interface
  - the interface between nanomaterials and biology...intended to facilitate communications between scientists, engineers, technologists, designers, manufacturers, regulators, NGOs, consumer organizations, members of the public and others with an interest in application or use of nanotechnologies in biology or biotechnology, or the use of biological matter or principles in nanotechnology.
- ISO/TS 80004-6:2021 Nanotechnologies—Vocabulary—Part 6: Nano-object characterization
  - terms and definitions relevant to the characterization of nano-objects.
- ISO/TS 80004-7:2011 Nanotechnologies—Vocabulary—Part 7: Diagnostics and therapeutics for healthcare
  - medical diagnostic and therapeutic applications; exploitation of material features at the nanoscale for diagnostic or therapeutic purposes in relation to human disease
- ISO/TS 80004-8:2020 Nanotechnologies—Vocabulary—Part 8: Nanomanufacturing processes
  - gives terms and definitions related to nanomanufacturing processes in the field of nanotechnologies. It forms one part of multi-part terminology and definitions documentation covering the different aspects of nanotechnologies.
- IEC/TS 80004-9:2017 Nanotechnologies—Vocabulary—Part 9: Nano-enabled electrotechnical products and systems
- ISO/TS 80004-11:2017 Nanotechnologies—Vocabulary—Part 11: Nanolayer, nanocoating, nanofilm, and related terms
- ISO/TS 80004-12:2016 Nanotechnologies—Vocabulary—Part 12: Quantum phenomena in nanotechnology
- ISO/TS 80004-13:2024 Nanotechnologies — VocabularyPart 13: Graphene and other two-dimensional (2D) materials

ISO/TS 80004-7:2011 provides consistent and unambiguous use of terms for healthcare professionals, manufacturers, consumers, technologists, patent agents, regulators, NGOs, and researchers, etc.

== Related standards ==
- ISO/TR 13121:2011, Nanomaterial risk evaluation
  - For "identifying, evaluating, addressing, making decisions about, and communicating the potential risks of developing and using manufactured nanomaterials, in order to protect the health and safety of the public, consumers, workers and the environment...risk evaluations and risk management decisions... in the face of incomplete or uncertain information... methods to update assumptions, decisions, and practices ... methods organizations can use to be transparent and accountable in how they manage nanomaterials. It describes a process of organizing, documenting, and communicating [about these]."
- ISO/TS 27687:2008 "Nanotechnologies - Terminology and definitions for nano-objects - Nanoparticle, nanofibre and nanoplate". Standard removed and replaced with ISO/TS 80004-2:2015.
