= Erica Lilleodden =

German materials scientist

Erica Thea Lilleodden is a materials scientist whose research focuses on the plasticity, micromechanics, and nanomechanics of materials, including metals, ceramics, and composite materials. Originally from the United States, she works in Germany as head of Microfabrication Processes at the Fraunhofer Institute for Silicon Technology in Itzehoe.

== Education and career ==
Lilleodden grew up in Saint Paul, Minnesota. She majored in materials science at the University of Minnesota, graduating in 1996, and completed her Ph.D. in materials science at Stanford University in 2001, including time as a visiting student at the Sandia National Laboratory.

After postdoctoral research at the Lawrence Berkeley National Laboratory, she first came to Germany in 2004 under a Humboldt Research Fellowship to the Karlsruhe Institute of Technology. There, she met her future husband, from northern Germany, leading her to remain in Germany. In 2006 she took a position as a laboratory director at the Helmholtz-Zentrum Hereon in Hamburg. At the Helmholtz Center, she became head of the Department of Experimental Materials Mechanics in 2010, and from 2014 to 2022 she added a second affiliation as Professor of Experimental Nano- and Micromechanics in the Institute of High Performance Ceramics at the Hamburg University of Technology.

She briefly returned to the University of Minnesota as Piercey Visiting Professor in 2020. In 2022 she became head of the Fraunhofer Institute for Microstructure of Materials and Systems (IMWS) in Halle, and in 2023 she also became Professor of Diagnostics and Structure of Materials at Martin Luther University Halle-Wittenberg. In 2026 she stepped down as head of IMWS and moved to the Fraunhofer Institute for Silicon Technology.

== Recognition ==
Lilleodden was the 2019 recipient of the DGM Prize of the German Society for Materials Science. She was elected to acatech, the German Academy of Science and Engineering, in 2023.
