= Nanomechanics =

Nanomechanics is a branch of nanoscience studying fundamental mechanical (elastic, thermal and kinetic) properties of physical systems at the nanometer scale. Nanomechanics has emerged on the crossroads of biophysics, classical mechanics, solid-state physics, statistical mechanics, materials science, and quantum chemistry. As an area of nanoscience, nanomechanics provides a scientific foundation of nanotechnology.

A ribosome is a biological machine that utilizes protein dynamics on nanoscales

Nanomechanics is that branch of nanoscience which deals with the study and application of fundamental mechanical properties of physical systems at the nanoscale, such as elastic, thermal and kinetic material properties.

Often, nanomechanics is viewed as a branch of nanotechnology, i.e., an applied area with a focus on the mechanical properties of engineered nanostructures and nanosystems (systems with nanoscale components of importance). Examples of the latter include nanomachines, nanoparticles, nanopowders, nanowires, nanorods, nanoribbons, nanotubes, including carbon nanotubes (CNT) and boron nitride nanotubes (BNNTs); nanoshells, nanomembranes, nanocoatings, nanocomposite/nanostructured materials, (fluids with dispersed nanoparticles); nanomotors, etc.

Some of the well-established fields of nanomechanics are: nanomaterials, nanotribology (friction, wear and contact mechanics at the nanoscale), nanoelectromechanical systems (NEMS), and nanofluidics.

As a fundamental science, nanomechanics is based on some empirical principles (basic observations), namely general mechanics principles and specific principles arising from the smallness of physical sizes of the object of study.

General mechanics principles include:

- Energy and momentum conservation principles
- Variational Hamilton's principle
- Symmetry principles

Due to smallness of the studied object, nanomechanics also accounts for:

- Discreteness of the object, whose size is comparable with the interatomic distances
- Plurality, but finiteness, of degrees of freedom in the object
- Importance of thermal fluctuations
- Importance of entropic effects (see configuration entropy)
- Importance of quantum effects (see quantum machine)

These principles serve to provide a basic insight into novel mechanical properties of nanometer objects. Novelty is understood in the sense that these properties are not present in similar macroscale objects or much different from the properties of those (e.g., nanorods vs. usual macroscopic beam structures). In particular, smallness of the subject itself gives rise to various surface effects determined by higher surface-to-volume ratio of nanostructures, and thus affects mechanoenergetic and thermal properties (melting point, heat capacitance, etc.) of nanostructures. Discreteness serves a fundamental reason, for instance, for the dispersion of mechanical waves in solids, and some special behavior of basic elastomechanics solutions at small scales. Plurality of degrees of freedom and the rise of thermal fluctuations are the reasons for thermal tunneling of nanoparticles through potential barriers, as well as for the cross-diffusion of liquids and solids. Smallness and thermal fluctuations provide the basic reasons of the Brownian motion of nanoparticles. Increased importance of thermal fluctuations and configuration entropy at the nanoscale give rise to superelasticity, entropic elasticity (entropic forces), and other exotic types of elasticity of nanostructures. Aspects of configuration entropy are also of great interest in the context self-organization and cooperative behavior of open nanosystems.

Quantum effects determine forces of interaction between individual atoms in physical objects, which are introduced in nanomechanics by means of some averaged mathematical models called interatomic potentials.

Subsequent utilization of the interatomic potentials within the classical multibody dynamics provide deterministic mechanical models of nano structures and systems at the atomic scale/resolution. Numerical methods of solution of these models are called molecular dynamics (MD), and sometimes molecular mechanics (especially, in relation to statically equilibrated (still) models). Non-deterministic numerical approaches include Monte Carlo, Kinetic More-Carlo (KMC), and other methods. Contemporary numerical tools include also hybrid multiscale approaches allowing concurrent or sequential utilization of the atomistic scale methods (usually, MD) with the continuum (macro) scale methods (usually, field emission microscopy) within a single mathematical model. Development of these complex methods is a separate subject of applied mechanics research.

Quantum effects also determine novel electrical, optical and chemical properties of nanostructures, and therefore they find even greater attention in adjacent areas of nanoscience and nanotechnology, such as nanoelectronics, advanced energy systems, and nanobiotechnology.

== See also ==
- Molecular machine
- Geometric phase (section Stochastic Pump Effect)
- Nanoelectromechanical relay
