= Nanoring =

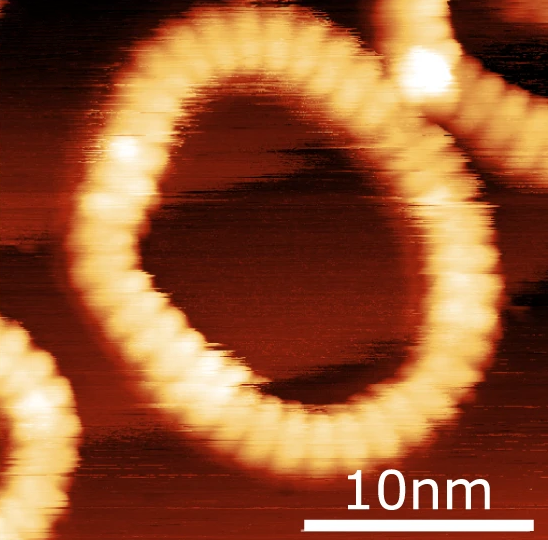
A nanoring consisting of 40 porphyrin subunits.

A nanoring is a cyclic nanostructure with a thickness small enough to be on the nanoscale (10^{−9} meters). Note that this definition allows the diameter of the ring to be larger than the nanoscale.

== Overview and history ==
The first nanorings were made of gallium nitride in 2001.

Nanorings have been prepared from zinc oxide and cyclo-para-phenylenes as well as porphyrins.

Although nanorings may have a diameter on the nanoscale, many of these materials have diameters that are larger than 100 nm, with many nanorings having a diameter on the microscale (10^{−6} meters). As such, nanorings are considered to be members of a sub-class of nanomaterials called one-dimensional (1-D) nanomaterials. These are nanomaterials in which one of the three physical dimensions in a single unit of the material is on a length scale greater than the nanoscale. Other examples of one-dimensional nanomaterials are nanowires, nanobelts, nanotubes, and nanosheets.

=== Mechanical ===
As with other nanomaterials, nanorings exhibit quantized phenomena.

ZnO nanorings made from the spontaneous folding of a single nanobelt crystal can be extensively mechanically manipulated without breaking or fracturing, giving them a unique mechanical advantage over other classes of ZnO nanostructures.

== Synthesis ==
Generally, nanorings are synthesized using a bottom-up approach, as top-down syntheses are limited by the entropic barriers presented by these materials. Currently, the number of different synthetic techniques used to make these particles is almost as diverse as the number of different types of nanorings themselves. One common method for synthesizing nanorings involves first synthesizing nanobelts or nanowires with an uneven charge distribution focused on the edges of the material. If these criteria are met, these particles may naturally self-assemble into ring structures such that Coulomb repulsion forces are minimized within the resulting crystal.

They cannot be grown on discrete crystal growth sites and thus, cannot be synthesized on a substrate with any crystallographic predictability. Therefore, nanorings are most commonly synthesized aqueously by creating entropically unique conditions which induce spontaneous nanoring self-assembly.

Other approaches for nanoring synthesis include the assembly of a nanoring around a small seed particle which is later removed or the expansion and twisting of porphyrin-like structures into a hollow nanoring structure.
