= Maria Calbi =

Argentine American physicist

María de las Mercedes Calbi is an Argentine American physicist whose research concerns surface science, and particularly adsorption of gases by carbon nanotubes and other nanostructures. She is a professor of physics at the University of Denver.

== Education and career ==
Calbi studied physics at the University of Buenos Aires, earning a bachelor's degree in 1995 and completing a Ph.D. in 2000 under the supervision of E. Susana Hernández.

After three years of postdoctoral research at the Pennsylvania State University, she became an assistant professor of physics at Southern Illinois University in 2003, and was tenured as an associate professor in 2009. She moved to the University of Denver in 2010.

== Recognition ==
After winning the National Science Foundation CAREER Award, Calbi became one of the 2008 winners of the Presidential Early Career Award for Scientists and Engineers.
