= European Union Observatory for Nanomaterials =

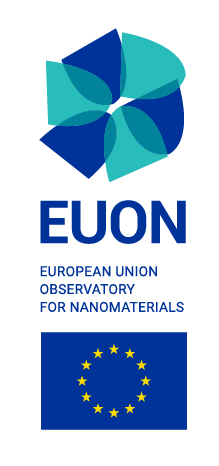
European Union Observatory for Nanomaterials (EUON) logo

The European Union Observatory for Nanomaterials (EUON) is an initiative that aims to increase the transparency and availability of information on nanomaterials to the general public. It was launched in June 2017.

The EUON collects existing information from databases, registries and studies and generates new data through additional studies and surveys on nanomaterials on the EU market.

The EUON website has content in 23 EU languages covering uses, safety, regulation, international activities as well as research and innovation.

It has been set-up, managed and maintained by the European Chemicals Agency (ECHA).

== Establishment ==
The EUON is the result of a perceived lack of necessary information about existing nanomaterials on the EU market. Against this background the European Commission conducted an impact assessment on different solutions to address the perception and increase the transparency of information. The European Commission also committed to address the issue of transparency as part of their Second Regulatory Review on Nanomaterials

The European Commission delegated ECHA with the creation, management and maintenance of the EUON because of the synergies between its scope and ECHA's tasks of managing and evaluating data from the implementation of European chemicals legislation, REACH, CLP and BPR.

== Lists and databases ==
The EUON compiles information about nanomaterials from different databases and lists.

- NanoData – A database with information on the development of nanomaterials and nanotechnology, focusing mainly on the EU market. It gives information on different sectors using nanomaterials, including health, energy, photonics, manufacturing, and information and communication technology. It also lists products that use nanomaterials and nanotechnology, patents, and research projects funded by the EU.
- eNanoMapper – Database with data on the toxicological properties of nanomaterials. The data is collected from several sources, including the EU-funded NanoREG project, a part of the EU NanoSafety Cluster (NSC), a cluster of European Commission-funded projects related to nanomaterials. The eNanoMapper is funded by the EU under its research and innovation programme.
- ECHA's database of registered nanoform substances – European Chemicals Agency (ECHA) publishes information on chemical substances registered under REACH. This information covers the intrinsic properties of each substance and their impact on health and the environment. The data comes directly from companies who make or import the substances. The database also includes substances in nano-form.
- Catalogue of nanomaterials in cosmetics – The European Commission maintains a catalogue of nanomaterials used in cosmetics placed on the EU market, based on information notified by industry. The EUON has matched these substances with those registered under the REACH Regulation to display publicly available information collected from REACH registration dossiers including information on the toxicological and ecotoxicological properties of the substances.
- List of nano-pigments on the EU market – The list consists of 81 substances from the European Chemicals Agency's chemicals database, the Belgian and French national inventories, the Danish Product Register and the EU catalogue of nanomaterials in cosmetic products.
