= Nanofabrics =

Textiles engineered with small particles

Nanofabrics are textiles engineered with small particles that give ordinary materials advantageous properties such as superhydrophobicity (extreme water resistance, also see "Lotus effect"), odor and moisture elimination, increased elasticity and strength, and bacterial resistance. Depending on the desired property, a nanofabric is either constructed from nanoscopic fibers called nanofibers, or is formed by applying a solution containing nanoparticles to a regular fabric. Nanofabrics research is an interdisciplinary effort involving bioengineering, molecular chemistry, physics, electrical engineering, computer science, and systems engineering. Applications of nanofabrics have the potential to revolutionize textile manufacturing and areas of medicine such as drug delivery and tissue engineering.

Electron microscope image of cotton fibers coated with gold (left) and palladium (right) nanoparticles. The nanoparticles make up just the outline of the fibers in these two images.

== Nanoscale ==
A fiber that has a width of less than 1000 nanometers (1000 nm or 1 μm) is generally defined as a nanofiber. A nanoparticle is defined as a small group of atoms or molecules with a radius of less than 100 nanometers (100 nm). Particles on the nanoscale have a very high surface area to volume ratio, whereas this ratio is much lower for objects on the macroscopic scale. A high relative surface area means that a large proportion of a particle's mass exists on its surface, so nanofibers and nanoparticles show a greater level of interaction with other materials. The high surface area to volume ratio observed in very small particles is what makes it possible to create many special properties exhibited by nanofabrics.

== Manufacture ==
The use of nanoparticles and nanofibers to produce specialized nanofabrics became a subject of interest after the sol-gel and electrospinning techniques were fully developed in the 1980s. Since 2000, dramatic increases in global funding have accelerated research efforts in nanotechnology, including nanofabrics research.

=== Sol-gel ===
The sol-gel process is used to create gel-like solutions which can be applied to textiles as a liquid finish to create nanofabrics with novel properties. The process begins with dissolving nanoparticles in a liquid solvent (often an alcohol). Once dissolved, several chemical reactions take place that cause the nanoparticles to grow and establish a network throughout the liquid. The network transforms the solution into a colloid (a suspension of solid particles in a liquid) with a gelatinous texture. Finally, the colloid must go through a drying process to remove excess solvent from the mixture before it can be used to treat fabrics. The sol-gel process is used in a similar fashion to make polymer nanofibers, which are long, ultra-thin chains of proteins bonded together.

=== Electrospinning ===
Electrospinning extracts nanofibers from polymer solutions (synthesized by the sol-gel process) and collects them to form nonwoven nanofabrics. A strong electric field is applied to the solution to charge the polymer strands. The solution is put into a syringe and aimed at an oppositely charged collector plate. When the force of attraction between the polymer nanofibers and the collector plate exceed the surface tension of the solution, the nanofibers are released from the solution and deposit onto the collector plate. The deposited fibers form a porous nanofabric that can aid in drug delivery and tissue engineering depending on the type of polymer used.

== Applications ==
=== Textile Manufacturing ===
When nanoengineered coatings are applied to fabrics, the nanoparticles readily form bonds with the fibers of the material. The high surface area relative to the volume of particles increases their chemical reactivity, allowing them to stick to materials more permanently. Fabrics treated with nanoparticle coatings during manufacturing produce materials that kill bacteria, eliminate moisture and odor, and prevent static electricity. Polymer nanofiber coatings applied to textiles bond to the material at one end of the polymer, forming a surface of tiny, hair-like structures. The polymer "hairs" create a thin layer that prevents liquids from making contact with the actual fabric. Nanofabrics with dirt-proof, stain-proof, and superhydrophobic properties are possible as a result of the layer formed by polymer nanofibers.

Development of nanofabrics for use in the clothing and textiles industry is still in its early stages. Some applications such as bacteria-resistant clothing are not yet practical from an economic standpoint. For example, a Cornell University student's prototype for a bactericidal jacket cost $10,000 alone, so it may be a long time before nanofabric clothing is on the market.

=== Drug Delivery ===
Nanofabrics used in medicine can deliver antibiotics, anticancer drugs, proteins, and DNA in precise quantities. Electrospinning creates porous nanofabrics that can be loaded with the desired drug which are then applied to the tissue of the targeted area. The drug passes through the tissue by diffusion, a process in which substances move through a membrane from high to low concentration. The rate at which the drug is administered can be changed by altering the composition of the nanofabric.

=== Tissue Engineering ===
Nonwoven fabrics made by electrospinning have the potential to assist in the growth of organ tissue, bone, neurons, tendons, and ligaments. Polymer nanofabrics can act either as a scaffold to support damaged tissue or as a synthetic substitute for actual tissue. Depending on the function, the nanofabric can be made of natural or synthetic polymers, or a combination of both.

== Environmental Implications ==
As nanotechnology advances, many studies have been conducted to determine the effects nanoengineered materials can have on the environment. Most textiles can lose up to 20% of their mass during their lifetime, so nanoparticles used in production of nanofabrics are at risk of being released into the air and waterways.

Nano-silver is expected to have as much as 49.5% of its global production taken by the nanotextiles industry due to its antibacterial properties. It is predicted that 20% of the nano-silver used in the nanofabrics industry will be released into waterways which could cause harm to microorganisms. However, more than 90% of nano-silver is removed during treatment at wastewater facilities, so it is likely that the environmental impact will be minimal. A study on aluminum oxide nanoparticles showed that inhalation caused inflammation in rat lungs. Aluminum oxide nanoparticles are not used in large quantity, so its health risks are negligible. Other studies conducted for nanoparticles suggest that their environmental impact should be low as the nanotextiles industry continues to grow.
