= Quantum heterostructure =

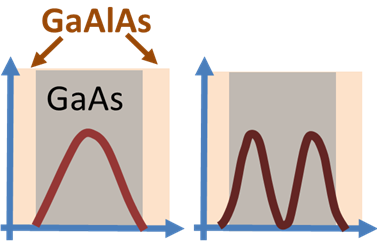
Electron probabilities in lowest two quantum states of a 160Ǻ GaAs quantum well in a GaAs-GaAlAs heterostructure as calculated from envelope functions.

A quantum heterostructure is a heterostructure in a substrate (usually a semiconductor material), where size restricts the movements of the charge carriers forcing them into a quantum confinement. This leads to the formation of a set of discrete energy levels at which the carriers can exist. Quantum heterostructures have sharper density of states than structures of more conventional sizes.

Quantum heterostructures are important for fabrication of short-wavelength light-emitting diodes and diode lasers, and for other optoelectronic applications, e.g. high-efficiency photovoltaic cells.

Examples of quantum heterostructures confining the carriers in quasi-two, -one and -zero dimensions are:

- Quantum wells
- Quantum wires
- Quantum dots

== See also ==
- http://www.ecse.rpi.edu/~schubert/Light-Emitting-Diodes-dot-org/chap04/chap04.htm
- Kitaev's periodic table
