= Nanopillar =

Pillar-shaped nanostructure

Nanopillars is an emerging technology within the field of nanostructures. Nanopillars are pillar shaped nanostructures approximately 10 nanometers in diameter that can be grouped together in lattice like arrays. They are a type of metamaterial, which means that nanopillars get their attributes from being grouped into artificially designed structures and not their natural properties. Nanopillars set themselves apart from other nanostructures due to their unique shape. Each nanopillar has a pillar shape at the bottom and a tapered pointy end on top. This shape in combination with nanopillars' ability to be grouped together exhibits many useful properties. Nanopillars have many applications including efficient solar panels, high resolution analysis, and antibacterial surfaces.

== Applications ==
=== Solar panels ===
Due to their tapered ends, nanopillars are very efficient at capturing light. Solar collector surfaces coated with nanopillars are three times as efficient as nanowire solar cells. Less material is needed to build a solar cell out of nanopillars compared to regular semi conductive materials. They also hold up well during the manufacturing process of solar panels. This durability allows manufacturers to use cheaper materials and less expensive methods to produce solar panels. Researchers are looking into putting dopants into the bottom of the nanopillars, to increase the amount of time photons will bounce around the pillars and thus the amount of light captured. As well as capturing light more efficiently, using nanopillars in solar panels will allow them to be flexible. The flexibility gives manufacturers more options on how they want their solar panels to be shaped as well as reduces costs in terms of how delicately the panels have to be handled. Although nanopillars are more efficient and cheaper than standard materials, scientists have not been able to mass-produce them yet. This is a significant drawback to using nanopillars as a part of the manufacturing process.

=== Antibacterial surfaces ===
Nanopillars also have functions outside of electronics and can imitate nature's defenses. Cicadas' wings are covered in tiny, nanopillar shaped rods. When bacteria rests on a cicada's wing, its cell membrane will stick to the nanopillars and the crevices between them, rupturing it. Since the rods on the cicadas are about the same size and shape as artificial nanopillars, it is possible for humans to copy this defense. A surface covered with nanopillars would immediately kill off all soft membrane bacteria. More rigid bacteria will be more likely to not rupture. If mass-produced and installed everywhere, nanopillars could reduce much of the risk of transmitting diseases through touching infected surfaces.

=== Antibacterial mechanism ===
There are several models proposed to explain the antibacterial mechanism of the nanopillars. According to the stretching and mechano-inducing model, for a relatively uniform nanotopographies like nanopillars found on cicada wing, the bacteria die due to the rupturing of bacterial cell wall that is suspended between two adjacent nanopillars as opposed to a puncturing mechanism. The nanopillar features like height, density, and sharpness of the nanopillars was found to be affecting the overall antibacterial properties of the nanopillars. However, the relative correlation of nanopillar features is difficult to establish due to several conflicting results in the literature. Alternative antibacterial mechanism of nanopillars include the potential effects of shear force, negative physiological response of bacteria, and intrinsic pressure effects from the interaction between bacterial surface proteins and nanopillars.

=== High resolution molecular analysis ===
Another use of nanopillars is observing cells. Nanopillars capture light so well that when lights hits them, the glow the nanopillars emit dies down at around 150 nanometers. Because this distance is less than the wavelength of light, it allows researchers to observe small objects without the interference of background light. This is especially useful in cellular analysis. The cells group around the nanopillars because of its small size and recognize it as an organelle. The nanopillars simply hold the cells in place while the cells are being observed.

=== Diamond-based quantum sensing ===
Nano pillars are used in quantum technologies to enhance the photon outcoupling efficiency of fluorescent defects. Nanopillars are especially effective in the context of color centers hosted in diamond. Due to the high refractive index of diamond, most of the photons originating from the fluorescence of, e.g. Nitrogen-Vacancy (NV) centers are lost due to total internal reflection. Nanopillars can enhance the outcoupling efficiency and the directionality of the color center emission. This allows significant boosts in sensitivity for the application of NV quantum sensing, both in the context of nanoscale nuclear magnetic resonance and quantum magnetometry (e.g., in the form of scanning probe microscopy). Zhu et al. have shown that it is crucial to include an appropriate tapering of the nanopillars to maximize collection efficiency.

== History ==
In 2006, researchers at the University of Nebraska-Lincoln and the Lawrence Livermore National Laboratory developed a cheaper and more efficient way to create nanopillars. They used a combination of nanosphere lithography (a way of organizing the lattice) and reactive ion etching(molding the nanopillars to the right shape) to make large groups of silicon pillars with less than 500 nm diameters. Then, in 2010, researchers fabricated a way to manufacture nanopillars with tapered ends. The former design of a pillar with a flat blunt top reflected much of the light coming onto the pillars. The tapered tops allow light to enter the forest of nanopillars and the wider bottom absorbs almost all of the light that hits it. This design captures about 99% of the light whereas nanorods which have a uniform thickness only captured 85% of the light. After the introduction of tapered ends, researchers started to find many more applications for nanopillars.

== Manufacturing process ==
Constructing nanopillars is a simple but lengthy procedure that can take hours. The process to create nanopillars starts with anodizing a 2.5 mm thick aluminum foil mold. Anodizing the foil creates pores in the foil a micrometer deep and 60 nanometers wide. The next step is to treat the foil with phosphoric acid which expands the pores to 130 nanometers. The foil is anodized once more making its pores a micrometer deeper. Lastly, a small amount of gold is added to the pores to catalyze the reaction for the growth of the semiconductor material. When the aluminum is scraped away there is a forest of nanopillars left inside a casing of aluminum oxide. Furthermore, pillar and tube structures can also be fabricated by the top-down approach of the combination of deep UV (DUV) lithography and atomic layer deposition (ALD).
