= Nanofilm =

Layer of material with nanometer-scale thickness

Nanofilms are thin films ranging from 1 to 100 nanometers in thickness. These materials exhibit unique chemical and physical properties, largely influenced by quantum behavior and surface effects. Their low surface energy, reduced friction coefficient, and high selectivity make them valuable across various industries, including solar energy, medicine, and food packaging. The properties of nanofilms are highly dependent on their chemical composition and molecular structure.

Nanofilms are characterized using a range of instrumental techniques, including scanning electron microscopy (SEM], X-ray diffraction (XRD), transmission electron microscopy (TEM), energy dispersive X-ray analysis (EDX), Raman spectroscopy, and UV-Vis absorption spectroscopy.

The nanofilm market has gained significant economic importance, with a market size of $2.06 billion, projected to grow to $7.09 billion by 2027. This growth is primarily driven by technological applications. Leading companies in the global nanofilm market include Nano Therapeutics Pvt. Ltd., Nanofilm, Cosmo Films Limited, Smart Source Technologies, Nano Foam Technology Private Limited, Advanced Thin Film, and MetaTechnica.

== Synthesis ==
Various methods are employed to synthesize nanofilms, with the chosen technique directly influencing the physicochemical properties and therefore applications of the films.

=== LBL assembly ===
Layer by layer (LbL) assembly is the most widely used method for nanofilm synthesis due to its simplicity, versatility, and precise control over film characteristics. Additionally, LBL offers an extensive choice of usable material for coating both planar and particulate substrates.Various molecules, including polymeric, organic, inorganic, and biomolecules, can be used to achieve desired functionalities. Generally, in LbL assembly, a charged material is adsorbed onto a substrate, followed by the deposition of an oppositely charged material on top of the first layer, forming a bilayer. Substrates can vary greatly in shape, size, or porosity and include surfaces, fibres, particles, and membranes. Five primary LbL assembly techniques exist.

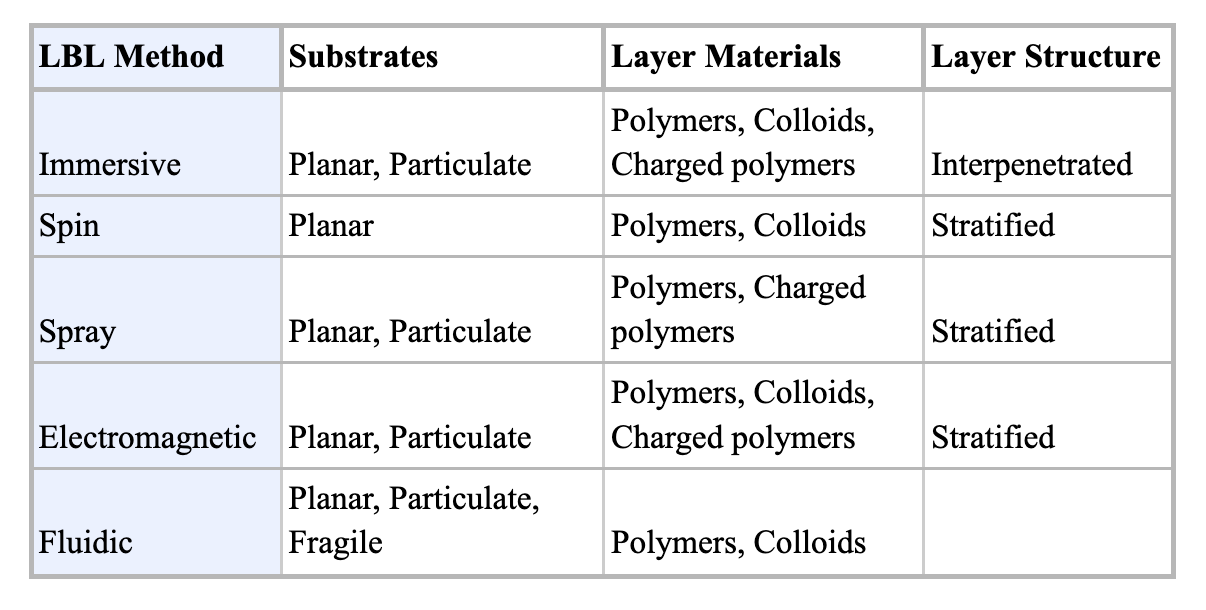
Figure 1: Overview of the five principal LbL assembly methods, highlighting substrate types, layer materials, and final layer structure.

==== Immersive or dip method ====
In this method, substrates are manually immersed in a solution of the desired composition, followed by washing and centrifugation to deposit layers. This process can be repeated to achieve the desired thickness and properties. In some circumstances, the substrate can be removed to create a free-standing film. Layering materials include polymers, colloids, and charged polymers. The resulting film is rough with interpenetrated layers. While effective, immersive methods require large amounts of material, leading to waste management challenges in industrial use. Innovations such as automation of labor-intensive steps and real-time monitoring using quartz crystal microbalances to enable computer monitored feedback loops are being explored to improve efficiency.

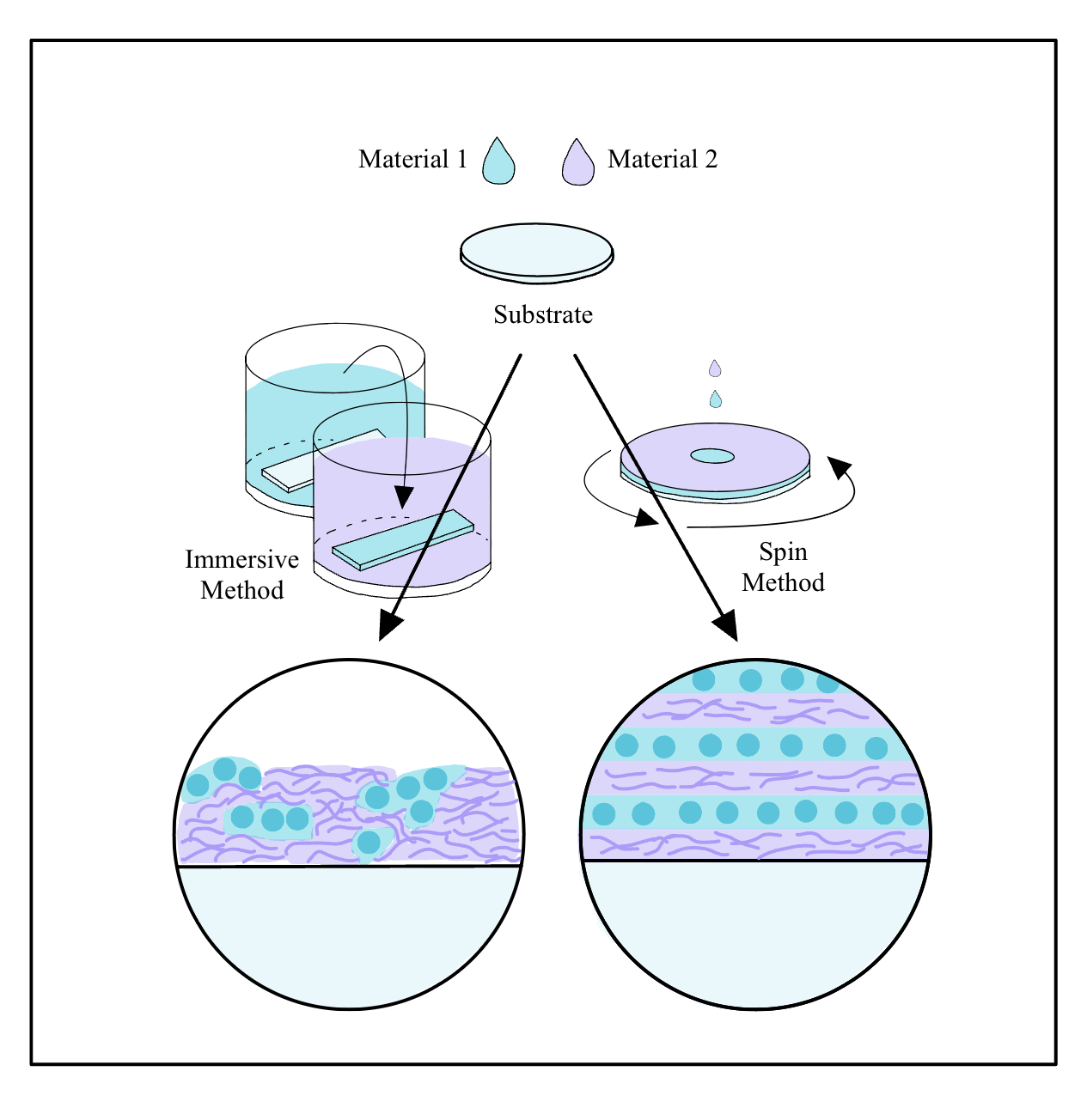
Figure 2: Comparison of immersive and spin LbL assembly methods. As shown above, the immersive technique produces a rough, interpenetrated film, while the spin method yields a smooth, stratified film.

==== Spin method ====
Spin methods involve depositing materials onto a spinning substrate. This method is generally used for flat substrates due to inherent limitations of spin coaters. This method can be applied to polymers and colloids. Compared to immersive LbL methods, spin coating offers rapid assembly and improved film organization. The resulting film is smooth and stratified, making it ideal for optical coatings, transparent films, and LED applications.

==== Spray method ====
Aerosolized polymer solutions are sprayed onto a substrate, making this method efficient and suitable for nonplanar surfaces. This method is organized, quick, and adaptable to a range of morphologies. Due to its speed and versatility, spray coating is particularly attractive for industrial-scale production.

==== Electromagnetic method ====
This technique employs electric or magnetic fields to deposit nanofilms onto substrates, resulting in densely packed films with greater thickness. There are three main types of electromagnetic LbL methods including electrodeposition, magnetic, and electro-immobilization methods. This method can be applied to polymers, colloids, and charged polymers.

Film thickness is directly related to the voltage used during assembly, with the optimal voltage depending on the pH of the polymer solution. Higher voltages can cause film desorption, as the electrode repels the previously deposited layer, and the resulting films tend to be more interpenetrated than those produced via the immersive method. Generally, films produced with the electromagnetic method are thicker and more densely packed than films created using other LbL methods. Moreover, this technique requires specialized equipment and expertise.

==== Fluidic assembly method ====
Using pressure or vacuum-driven channels, this method enables nanofilm deposition on surfaces that are otherwise difficult to access, such as the interiors of capillaries. Fluidic assembly is used primarily for polymers, but can also be applied to colloids.

=== Other methods ===
==== Electrospinning ====
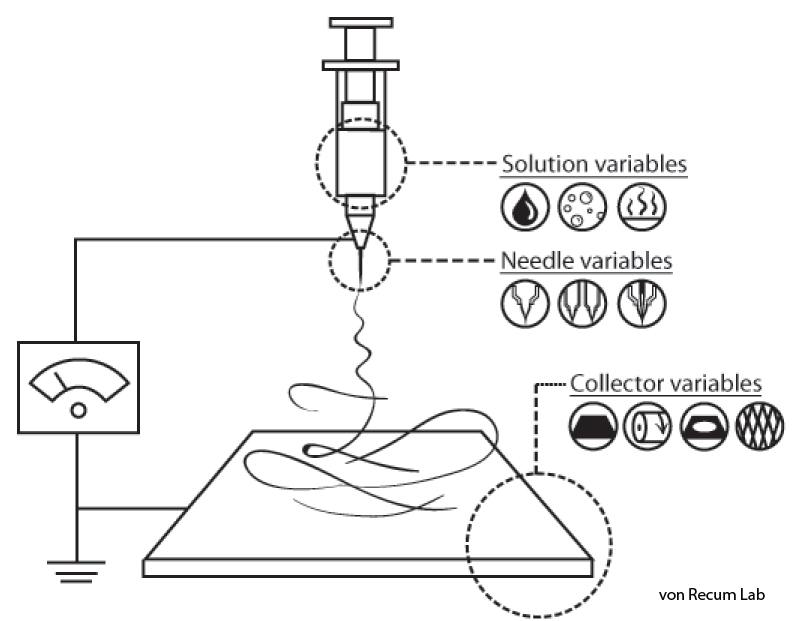
Figure 3: Image illustrating the electrospinning technique along with its adjustable parameters: solution composition, needle configuration, and collector variables.

Electrospinning utilizes an external electric field to collect nanofibers on a plate acting as an electrode. The polymer solution or melt used can be manipulated to achieve specific functionalities and morphologies on the surface of the film. Electrospinning enables the creation of ultrathin, high-porosity films and can be created using both synthetic and natural polymer materials.

==== ADL ====
Atomic layer deposition (ALD) is a vapor-phase technique used to produce films with high conformality and precise thickness control. The process relies on self-limiting surface reactions, where only one monolayer is deposited during each cycle. This is achieved through sequential, alternating pulses of gaseous precursors that react with the substrate. The individual gas-surface reactions, or half-reaction, is followed by an inert gas purge to remove byproducts before the introduction of a counter-reactant. The cycle is repeated until the desired film thickness is reached. ALD is versatile, enabling the deposition of a wide range of materials, including metals, insulators, and semiconductors in both crystalline and amorphous forms. Common elements used to create the material are oxides, nitrides, and sulfides. ALD is widely applied in photovoltaics, fuel cells, and semiconductor manufacturing.

==== Thermal evaporation ====
Thermal evaporation is a form of physical vapor deposition (PVD) technique that employs a heat source to vaporize a solid material typically in the form of a rod or wire within a vacuum chamber. The resulting vapor is thermally transported through the vacuum and condenses onto a substrate, creating a thin film. Benefits of thermal evaporation include controlled thickness and uniform, reproducible coatings. This method also features minimal contamination, simplicity, versatility, and cost-effectiveness. It is capable of depositing a wide range of materials such as metals, alloys, and organic compounds, making it suitable for diverse applications in the semiconductor industry, optics, photovoltaics, OLED displays, and sensors.

== Applications ==
=== Medical ===
There are many promising applications of nanofilms in medicine, including coatings for medical implant devices, scaffolds for tissue engineering, coatings for targeted drug delivery, artificial cells for oxygen therapeutics, and artificial viruses for immunization [5,8]. Cell coatings can be applied for diagnosis and cell studies due to nanofilms' ability to attach to biomolecules and replicate molecule diffusion. For example, by layering polymers and nanoparticles on a cell wall, one can create cell-based biosensors. Applying a polymer film onto a cell with attached functional molecules results in targeted molecule delivery.

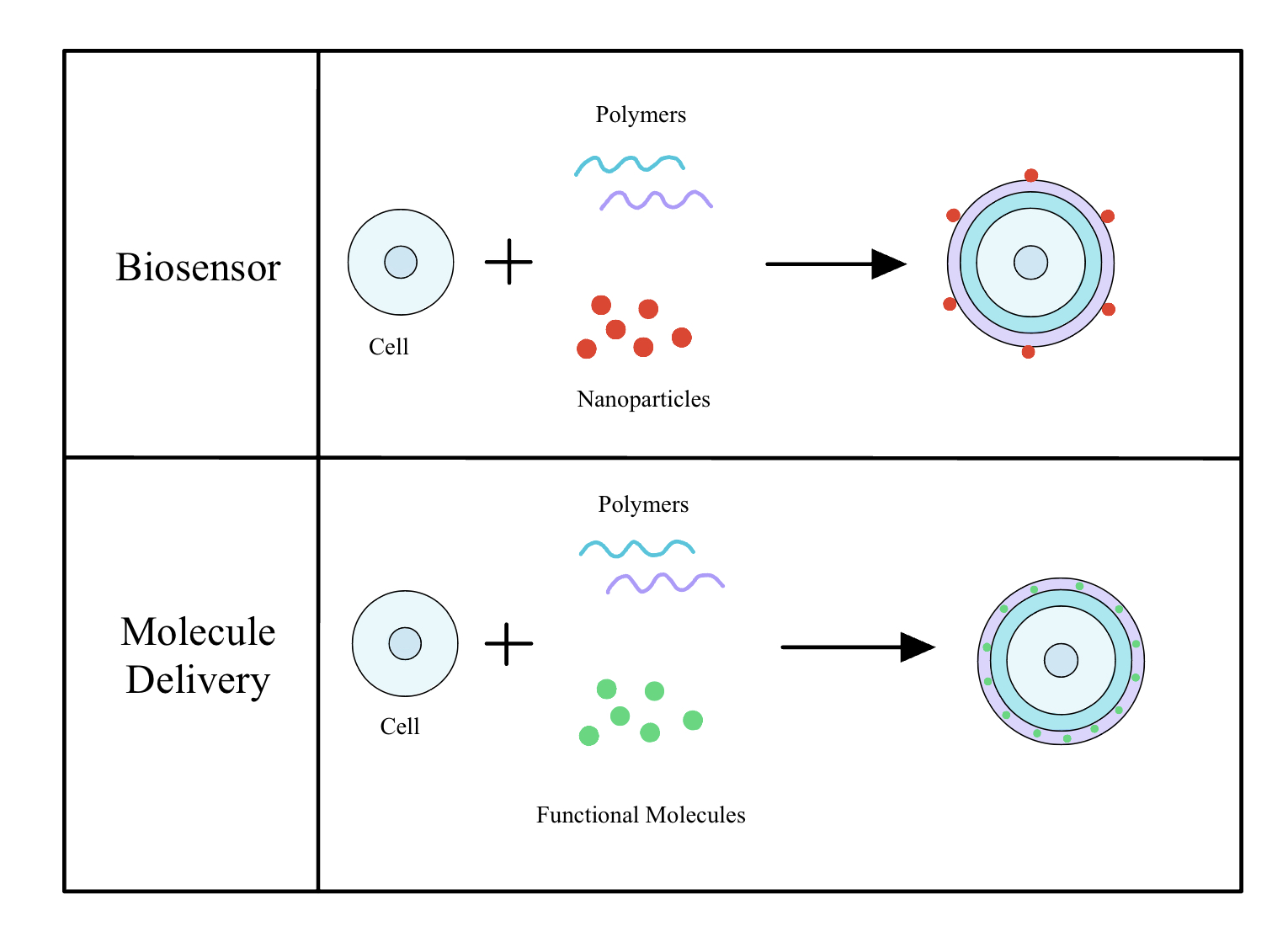
Figure 4: Graphic representation of layer-by-layer assembly for biosensors and molecule delivery.

By controlling the composition of the film, protein-inspired polypeptide films are being investigated for the development of artificial cells. These films have successfully encapsulated glucose oxidase and hemoglobin. Further research is aimed at applying polypeptide films to encapsulate different drugs for targeted and sustained-release delivery.

Carbon nanotubes are used to form nanofilm materials in implants. These films act as antimicrobial agents. The nanofilm is capable of destroying pathogens without the use of antibiotic or other biochemical agents, instead they act through disruption of the cell wall. A nanofilm coating comes in direct contact with the cell wall causing disruption of the cell.

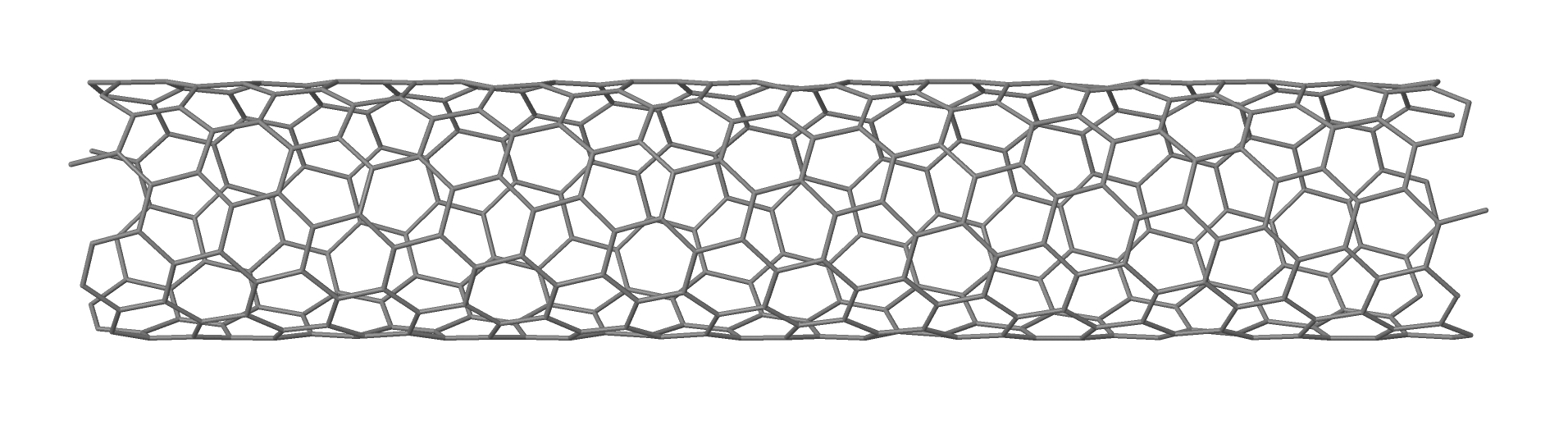
Figure 5: The image shows the structure of a carbon nanotube.

=== Solar ===
Nanofilms offer significant potential for improving the efficiency in photovoltaic-thermal collectors. Hybrid photovoltaic-thermal (PV-T) collectors are capable of generating thermal energy and electricity and offer significantly higher overall efficiency compared to independent photovoltaic panels. Nanofilms selectively filter light, allowing only specific parts of the light spectrum to pass through the films. This selectivity allows the light to either be absorbed or reflected to match characteristics of respective solar cells. A glass substrate coated with the nanofilm layers comprises the selectively reflective layer. This ultimately results in increased efficiency.

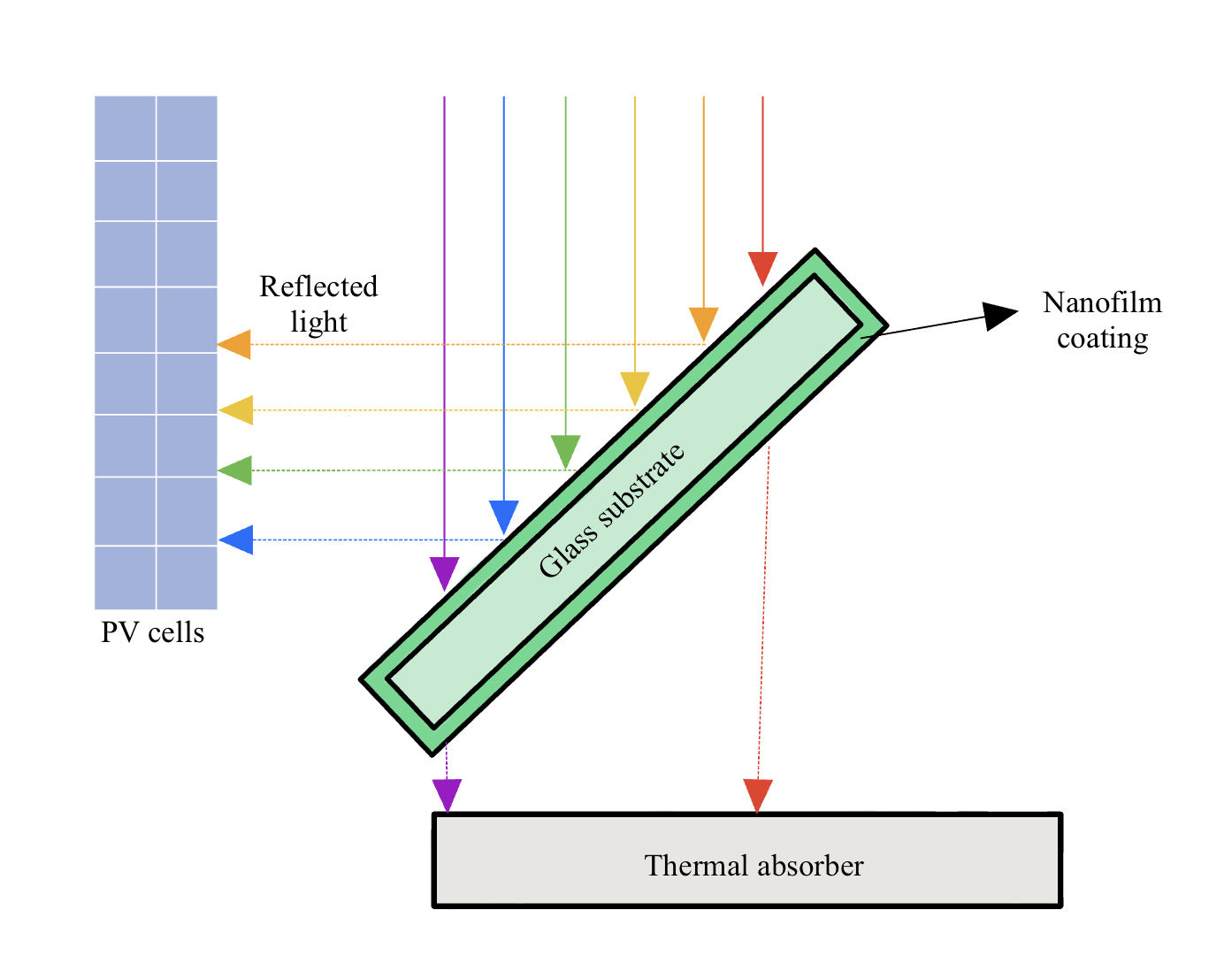
Figure 6: Schematic representation of the basic structure of a nanofilm-based PV-T collector.

The spectral fraction absorbed by the thermal absorber (G_{th}(λ)) can be calculated using the following equation:

G_{th}(λ)=G_{in}(λ)𝜏_{n}(λ)

Meanwhile, spectral fraction reflected to the PV cells (G_{pv}(λ)) can be calculated using the following equation:

G_{pv}(λ)=G_{in}(λ)Ƴ_{n}(λ)

Where 𝜏_{n}(λ) is the transmissivity of the nanofilm filter, Ƴ_{n}(λ) is the reflectivity of the filter, and G_{in}(λ) is the incident spectral energy distribution

TiO_{2}/SiO_{2} is a common stack of nanofilms that significantly reduce absorption loss and can offer high selectivity of cut-off wavelength. Layer thickness ranges from 10 to 110 nm. The cut off wavelength can be adjusted by changing the film material, thickness and number of layers.

=== Nanoedible films ===
Nanofilms can be used as edible packaging on food surfaces. This emerging application has anti-browning, antioxidant, and antimicrobial properties. In addition, by acting as a moisture barrier, nanoedible films decrease the use of plastic packaging. Edible polymer films are laid within an edible matrix and can be made from a range of different organic materials ranging from polysaccharide-based to protein-based films.

Chitosan-based nanofilms, for example, offer microbial resistance as well as a slowed ripening process. Furthermore, the film itself is nontoxic, biodegradable, and biocompatible.

== Toxicity ==
While nanofilms offer numerous benefits, concerns regarding their toxicity and environmental impact persist. The mechanisms underlying their toxic effects remain poorly understood due to variations in experimental conditions, such as nanoparticle concentration and structuring methods.

Further research is necessary to assess the degradability, safety, and environmental footprint of nanofilms, particularly as their use expands across industries. Regulatory frameworks and standardized toxicity testing methods will be essential in ensuring their safe and sustainable implementation.
