= Nanorod =

Nanomaterial

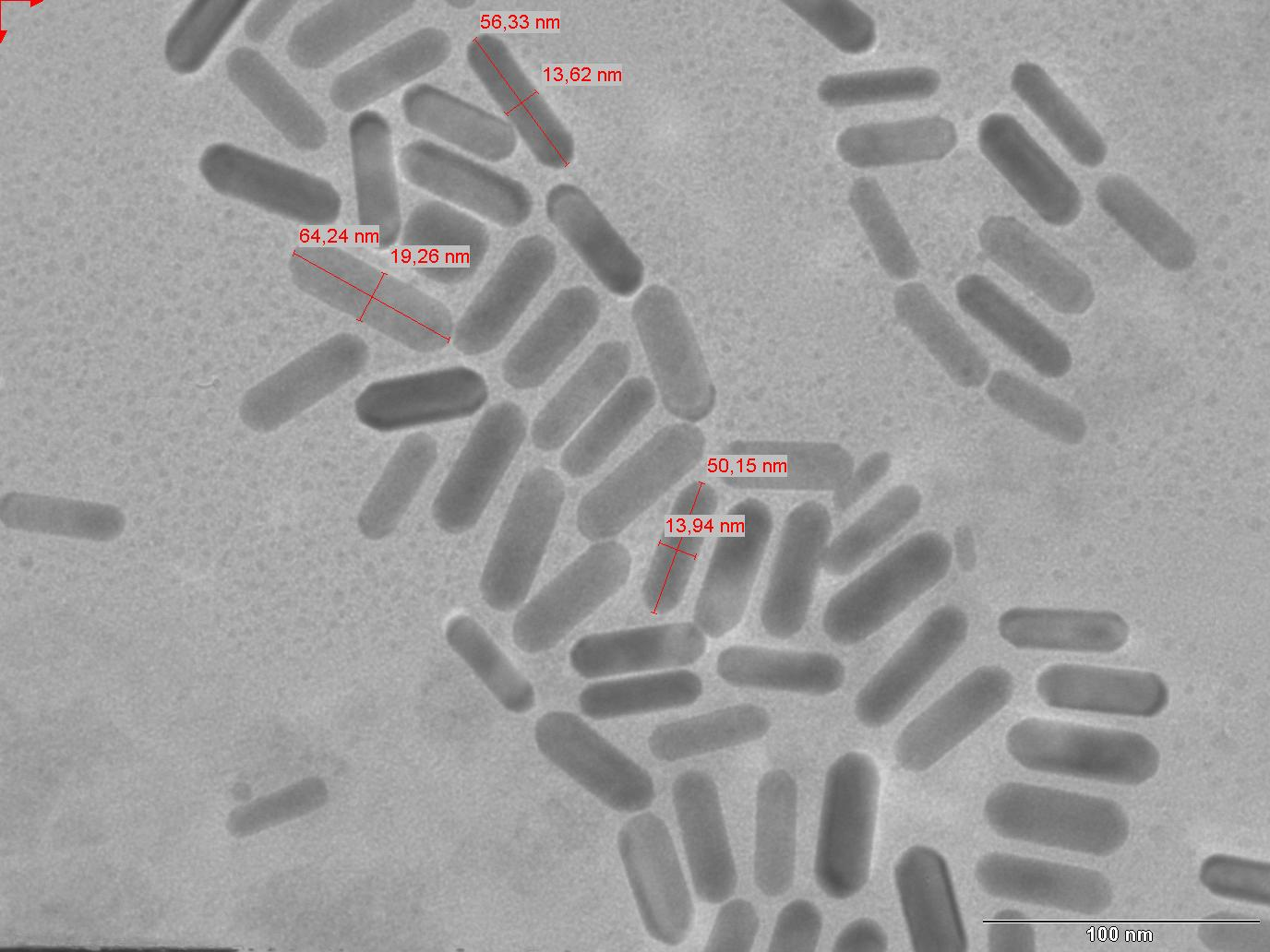
Gold nanorods under electron microscopy

In nanotechnology, nanorods are one morphology of nanoscale objects. Each of their dimensions range from 1–100 nm. They may be synthesized from metals or semiconducting materials. Standard aspect ratios (length divided by width) are 3-5. Nanorods are produced by direct chemical synthesis. A combination of ligands act as shape control agents and bond to different facets of the nanorod with different strengths. This allows different faces of the nanorod to grow at different rates, producing an elongated object.

One potential application of nanorods is in display technologies, because the reflectivity of the rods can be changed by changing their orientation with an applied electric field. Another application is for microelectromechanical systems (MEMS). Nanorods, along with other noble metal nanoparticles, also function as theragnostic agents. Nanorods absorb in the near IR, and generate heat when excited with IR light. This property has led to the use of nanorods as cancer therapeutics. Nanorods can be conjugated with tumor targeting motifs and ingested. When a patient is exposed to IR light (which passes through body tissue), nanorods selectively taken up by tumor cells are locally heated, destroying only the cancerous tissue while leaving healthy cells intact.

Nanorods based on semiconducting materials have also been investigated for application as energy harvesting and light emitting devices. In 2006, Ramanathan et al. demonstrated^{1} electric-field mediated tunable photoluminescence from ZnO nanorods, with potential for application as novel sources of near-ultraviolet radiation.

== Synthesis ==
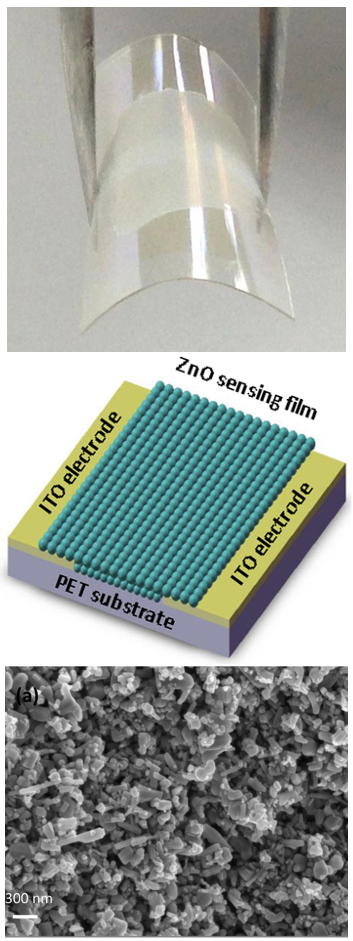
An ethanol gas sensor, based on ZnO nanorods

=== ZnO nanorods ===
Zinc oxide (ZnO) nanorod, also known as nanowire, has a direct bandgap energy of 3.37 eV, which is similar to that of GaN, and it has an excitation binding energy of 60 meV. The optical bandgap of ZnO nanorod can be tuned by changing the morphology, composition, size etc. ZnO nanorods have been used to fabricate nano-scale electronic devices, including field effect transistor, ultraviolet photodetector, Schottky diode, and ultra-bright light-emitting diode (LED). Various methods have been developed to fabricate the single crystalline, wurtzite ZnO nanorods. Among those methods, growing from vapor phase is the most developed approach. In a typical growth process, ZnO vapor is condensed onto a solid substrate. ZnO vapor can be generated by three methods: thermal evaporation, chemical reduction, and Vapor-Liquid-Solid (VLS) method. In the thermal evaporation method, commercial ZnO powder is mixed with SnO_{2} and evaporated by heating the mixture at elevated temperature. In the chemical reduction method, zinc vapor, generated by the reduction of ZnO, is transferred to the growth zone, followed by reoxidation to ZnO. The VLS process, originally proposed in 1964, is the most commonly used process to synthesize single crystalline ZnO nanorods. In a typical process, catalytic droplets are deposited on the substrate and the gas mixtures, including Zn vapor and a mixture of CO/CO_{2}, react at the catalyst-substrate interface, followed by nucleation and growth. Typical metal catalysts involve gold, copper, nickel, and tin. ZnO nanowires are grown epitaxially on the substrate and assemble into monolayer arrays. Metal-organic chemical vapor deposition (MOCVD) has also been developed. No catalyst is involved in this process and the growth temperature is at 400 ~500 °C, i.e. considerably milder conditions compared to the traditional vapor growth method. Moreover, metal oxide nanorods (ZnO, CuO, Fe_{2}O_{3}, V_{2}O_{5}, others) can be simply made by heating initial metal in air in a thermal oxidation process. For example, to make a dense "carpet" of CuO nanorods it was found to be enough to heat Cu foil in air at 420 °C. Apart from these manufacturing schemes, ZnO nanorods and tubes can be fabricated by the combination of deep UV lithography, dry etch, and atomic layer deposition (ALD).

=== InGaN/GaN nanorods ===
InGaN/GaN nanorod array light-emitting diodes can be manufactured with dry etching or focused ion beam etching techniques. Such LEDs emit polarized blue or green light Three-dimensional nanorod structures have a larger emitting surface, which results in better efficiency and light emission compared to planar LEDs. Ink-printed quantum dot nanorod LED (QNED) displays are being researched by Samsung, with InGaN nanorod LEDs replacing the organic OLED layer in QD-OLED displays.

=== Gold nanorods ===
The seed-mediated growth method is the most common and achieved method for synthesizing high-quality gold nanorods. A typical growth protocol involves the addition of gold nanospheres capped by cetyltrimethylammonium bromide (CTAB) or citrate, served as seeds, to the bulk HAuCl_{4} growth solution. The growth solution is obtained by the reduction of HAuCl_{4} with ascorbic acid in the presence of cetyltrimethylammonium bromide (CTAB) surfactant and silver ions. Longer nanorods (up to an aspect ratio of 25) can be obtained in the absence of silver nitrate by use of a three-step addition procedure. In this protocol, seeds are sequentially added to growth solution in order to control the rate of heterogeneous deposition and thereby the rate of crystal growth.

The shortcoming of this method is the formation of gold nanospheres, which requires non-trivial separations and cleanings. In one modifications of this method sodium citrate is replaced with a stronger CTAB stabilizer in the nucleation and growth procedures. Raising the pH is another way to achieve high aspect ratio (> 25:1) nanorods with high yield (> 90%) at the cost of increased polydispersity. Another improvement is to introduce silver ions to the growth solution, which results in the nanorods of aspect ratios less than five in greater than 90% yield. Silver, of a lower reduction potential than gold, can be reduced on the surface of the rods to form a monolayer by underpotential deposition. Here, silver deposition competes with that of gold, thereby retarding the growth rate of specific crystal facets, allowing for one-directional growth and rod formation. Another shortcoming of this method is the high toxicity of CTAB. Polymers, such as Polyethylene glycol (PEG), Polyallylamine hydrochloride (PAH) coating; dietary fibers, such as chitosan; or biomolecules, such as phospholipids have been used to displace the CTAB out from the nanorod surface without affecting the stability has been reported.

=== Cation exchange ===
The Cation exchange is a conventional but promising technique for new nanorod synthesis. Cation exchange transformations in nanorods are kinetically favorable and often shape-conserving. Compared to bulk crystal systems, the cation exchange of nanorods is million-times faster due to high surface area. Existing nanorods serve as templates to make a variety of nanorods that are not accessible in traditional wet-chemical synthesis. Furthermore, complexity can be added by partial transformation, making nanorod heterostructures.

== See also ==
- Nanowire
- Nanopillar
- Aggregated diamond nanorod
- Colloidal gold
- nano
