= Outline of nanotechnology =

Overview of and topical guide to nanotechnology

The following outline is provided as an overview of and topical guide to nanotechnology:

Nanotechnology is science, engineering, and technology conducted at the nanoscale, which is about 1 to 100 nanometers.

== Branches of nanotechnology ==
- Green nanotechnology – use of nanotechnology to enhance the environmental-sustainability of processes currently producing negative externalities. It also refers to the use of the products of nanotechnology to enhance sustainability.
- Nanoengineering – practice of engineering on the nanoscale.

=== Multi-disciplinary fields that include nanotechnology ===
- Nanobiotechnology – intersection of nanotechnology and biology.
- Ceramic engineering – science and technology of creating objects from inorganic, non-metallic materials.
- Materials science – interdisciplinary field applying the properties of matter to various areas of science and engineering. It investigates the relationship between the structure of materials at atomic or molecular scales and their macroscopic properties.
- Molecular engineering

=== Contributing fields ===
==== Nanoscience ====
- Nanoelectronics – use of nanotechnology on electronic components, including transistors so small that inter-atomic interactions and quantum mechanical properties need to be studied extensively.
- Nanomechanics – branch of nanoscience studying fundamental mechanical (elastic, thermal and kinetic) properties of physical systems at the nanometer scale.
- Nanophotonics – study of the behavior of light on the nanometer scale.

==== Other contributing fields ====
- Calculus
- Chemistry
- Computer science
- Engineering
- Miniaturization
- Physics
- Protein engineering
- Quantum mechanics
- Self-organization
- Science
- Supramolecular chemistry
- Tissue engineering
- Robotics
- Medicine

== Risks of nanotechnology ==
Implications of nanotechnology

- Health impact of nanotechnology
- Environmental impact of nanotechnology
- Regulation of nanotechnology
- Societal impact of nanotechnology

== Applications of nanotechnology ==
- Energy applications of nanotechnology
- Quantum computing – computation using quantum mechanical phenomena, such as superposition and entanglement, to perform data operations.
- List of nanotechnology applications

=== Nanomaterials ===
- Nanomaterials – field that studies materials with morphological features on the nanoscale, and especially those that have special properties stemming from their nanoscale dimensions.

==== Fullerenes and carbon forms ====
Fullerene – any molecule composed entirely of carbon, in the form of a hollow sphere, ellipsoid, or tube. Fullerene spheres and tubes have applications in nanotechnology.

- Allotropes of carbon –
- Aggregated diamond nanorods –
- Buckypaper –
- Carbon nanofoam –
- Carbon nanotube –
  - Nanoknot –
  - Nanotube membrane –
- Fullerene chemistry –
  - Bingel reaction –
  - Endohedral hydrogen fullerene –
  - Prato reaction –
- Endohedral fullerenes –
- Fullerite –
- Graphene –
  - Graphene nanoribbon –
- Potential applications of carbon nanotubes –
- Timeline of carbon nanotubes –

==== Nanoparticles and colloids ====
Nanoparticle –

- Ceramics processing –
- Colloid –
- Colloidal crystal –
- Diamondoids –
- Fiveling -
- Nanocomposite –
- Nanostructure –
  - Nanocages –
  - Nanocomposite –
  - Nanofabrics –
  - Nanofiber –
  - Nanofoam –
  - Nanoknot –
  - Nanomesh –
  - Nanopillar –
  - Nanopin film –
  - Nanoring –
  - Nanorod –
  - Nanoshell –
  - Nanotube –
  - Quantum dot –
  - Quantum heterostructure –
  - Sculptured thin film –

=== Nanomedicine ===
Nanomedicine –

- Lab-on-a-chip –
- Nanobiotechnology –
- Nanosensor –
- Nanotoxicology –

=== Molecular self-assembly ===
Molecular self-assembly –

- DNA nanotechnology –
  - DNA computing –
  - DNA machine –
  - DNA origami –
- Self-assembled monolayer –
- Supramolecular assembly –

== Nanoelectronics ==
Nanoelectronics –

- Break junction –
- Chemical vapor deposition –
- Microelectromechanical systems (MEMS)
- Nanocircuits –
- Nanocomputer –
- Nanoelectromechanical systems (NEMS)
- Surface micromachining –
- Nanoelectromechanical relays

=== Molecular electronics ===
Molecular electronics –

=== Nanolithography ===
Nanolithography –

- Electron beam lithography –
- Ion-beam sculpting –
- Nanoimprint lithography –
- Photolithography –
- Scanning probe lithography –
- Molecular self-assembly –
- IBM Millipede –

== Molecular nanotechnology ==
Molecular nanotechnology –

- Grey goo –
- Mechanosynthesis –
- Molecular assembler –
- Molecular modelling –
- Nanorobotics –
  - Smartdust –
  - Utility fog –
- Nanochondria –
- Programmable matter –
- Self reconfigurable –
- Self-replication –

== Devices ==
- Micromachinery –
- Nano-abacus –
- Nanomotor –
- Nanopore –
  - Nanopore sequencing –
- Quantum point contact –
- Synthetic molecular motors –
- Carbon nanotube actuators –

=== Microscopes and other devices ===
Microscopy –

- Atomic force microscope –
- Electron microscopy -
- Scanning tunneling microscope –
- Scanning probe microscope –
- Sarfus –

== Notable organizations in nanotechnology ==
List of nanotechnology organizations

=== Government ===
- National Cancer Institute (US)
- National Institutes of Health (US)
- National Nanotechnology Initiative (US)
- Russian Nanotechnology Corporation (RU)
- Seventh Framework Programme (FP7) (EU)

=== Advocacy and information groups ===
- American Chemistry Council (US)
- American Nano Society (US)
- Center for Responsible Nanotechnology (US)
- Foresight Institute (US)
- Project on Emerging Nanotechnologies (global)

=== Manufacturers ===
- Cerion Nanomaterials, Metal / Metal Oxide / Ceramic Nanoparticles (US)
- OCSiAl, Carbon Nanotubes (Luxembourg)

== Notable figures in nanotechnology ==
- Phaedon Avouris - first electronic devices made out of carbon nanotubes
- Gerd Binnig - co-inventor of the scanning tunneling microscope
- Heinrich Rohrer - co-inventor of the scanning tunneling microscope
- Vicki Colvin Director for the Center for Biological and Environmental Nanotechnology, Rice University
- Eric Drexler - was the first to theorise about nanotechnology in depth and popularised the subject
- Richard Feynman - gave the first mention of some of the distinguishing concepts in a 1959 talk, entitled There's Plenty of Room at the Bottom
- Robert Freitas - nanomedicine theorist
- Andre Geim - Discoverer of 2-D carbon film called graphene
- Sumio Iijima - discoverer of carbon nanotube
- Harry Kroto - co-discoverer of buckminsterfullerene
- Akhlesh Lakhtakia - conceptualized sculptured thin films
- Ralph Merkle - nanotechnology theorist
- Carlo Montemagno - inventor ATP nanobiomechanical motor (UCLA)
- Erwin Wilhelm Müller - invented the field ion microscope, and the atom probe
- Chris Phoenix - co-founder of the Center for Responsible Nanotechnology
- Uri Sivan - set up and led the Russell Berrie Nanotechnology Research Institute at Technion in Israel
- Richard Smalley - co-discoverer of buckminsterfullerene
- Norio Taniguchi - coined the term "nano-technology"
- Mike Treder - co-founder of the Center for Responsible Nanotechnology
- Joseph Wang - pioneer in electrochemical sensors exploiting nanostructured materials; synthetic nanomotors
- Alex Zettl - Built the first molecular motor based on carbon nanotubes
- Russell M. Taylor II - co-director of the UNC CISMM
- Adriano Cavalcanti - nanorobot expert working at CAN
- Lajos P. Balogh - editor in chief of the Precision Nanomedicine journal
- Charles M. Lieber - pioneer on nanoscale materials (Harvard)

== See also ==
- Catalyst
- Macromolecule
- Mesh networking
- Monolayer
- Nanometer
- Nanosub
- NBI Knowledgebase
- Photonic crystal
- Potential well
- Quantum confinement
- Quantum tunneling
- Self-assembly
- Self-organization
- Technological singularity

Place these

- History of nanotechnology
- List of nanotechnology organizations
- Nanotechnology in fiction
- Outline of nanotechnology
- Impact of nanotechnology
  - Nanomedicine
  - Nanotoxicology
  - Green nanotechnology
  - Health and safety hazards of nanomaterials
  - Regulation of nanotechnology
- Nanomaterials
  - Fullerenes
  - Carbon nanotubes
  - Nanoparticles
- Molecular self-assembly
  - Self-assembled monolayer
  - Supramolecular assembly
  - DNA nanotechnology
- Nanoelectronics
  - Molecular scale electronics
  - Nanolithography
- Nanometrology
  - Atomic force microscopy
  - Scanning tunneling microscope
  - Electron microscope
  - Super resolution microscopy
  - Nanotribology
- Molecular nanotechnology
  - Molecular assembler
  - Nanorobotics
  - Mechanosynthesis
  - Molecular engineering
