= Nanopunk =

Subgenre of science fiction

Nanopunk is a subgenre of science fiction that describes a world where nanites and bio-nanotechnologies are widely in use and nanotechnologies are the predominant technological forces in society, similar to biopunk.

The genre is mainly concerned with the artistic, psychological, and societal impact of nanotechnology, rather than aspects of the technology which itself is still in its infancy. Unlike cyberpunk, which can be distinguished by a gritty and low-life yet technologically advanced character, nanopunk can have a darker dystopian character that might examine potential risks by nanotechnology as well as a more optimistic outlook that might emphasize potential uses of nanotechnology.

== Comics ==
- M. Rex (1999) features nanites as the source of power for the title character.
- Scooby Apocalypse (2016–2019) reveals early on that a nanite virus originating from Velma's "Elysium Project" experiment is the reason behind people becoming monsters.

== Literature ==
- Kathleen Ann Goonan (Queen City Jazz – 1997) and Linda Nagata were some of the earliest writers to feature nanotech as the primary element in their work.
- Neal Stephenson's The Diamond Age is a coming of age story, set in a future in which nanotechnology affects all aspects of life.
- Some novels of Stanislaw Lem, including Weapon System of the Twenty First Century or The Upside-down Evolution, The Invincible and Peace on Earth as well as Greg Bear's Blood Music could also be considered precursors of nanopunk.
- Michael Crichton novel Prey (2002). Another of Crichton's novels, Micro (2011), could also be an example, but it focuses more on the idea of size-manipulation and shrinking of objects rather than nanotechnology.
- Nathan McGrath's Nanopunk (2013) is set in an icebound near-future where almost half the world's population has been wiped out. Alister, a child when "The Big Freeze" began is now a teenager in a society slowly finding its feet. Unaware of his nano-infection he sets out to find his lost sister and is joined by Suzie, a militant cyber-activist. Their hacking attracts the attention of Secret Services and a ruthless private military corporation and their search becomes a deadly race for survival.
- Linda Nagata's Tech Heaven (1995) is a futuristic thriller about Katie, a woman whose husband is about to die of injuries sustained in a helicopter crash. Instead of dying, he gets his body cryogenically preserved so that he can be reawakened when med-tech is advanced enough to heal him. The problem is that it winds up taking far more than the estimated few years for this to happen.
- Alastair Reynolds' Chasm City could also be considered nanopunk.

== Film and television ==
=== Film ===
- The Day the Earth Stood Still (2008 film)
- G.I. Joe: The Rise of Cobra (2009 film)
- Transcendence (2014 film)
- Faction (2020 Film)

=== Television ===
- Futurama, "Parasites Lost" (2001) - Fry is infected by parasites that increase his intelligence and health, but ultimately chooses to get rid of them with miniature droids.
- Justice League, "Tabula Rasa" (2003) - The villain, Amazo, is an android composed of nanites that allow him to mimic abilities.
- Static Shock, "Hoop Squad" (2004) - The villain, Dr. Odium, is a scientist specializing in nanotechnology who was fired for attempting to experiment on humans.
- Doctor Who, "The Doctor Dances" (2005) - Two ships seen in the episode contain nanogenes that can heal wounds.
- Generator Rex (2010–2013) - Nanites are central to the premise of the series, in which an accident caused them to spread across the world and infect almost all life. Protagonist Rex Salazar is able to control his own nanites and cure the mutations caused by them, and thus works for the government agency Providence, battling nanite mutants (called E.V.O.S).

== Video games ==
- Anarchy Online (2001)
- Crysis (2007–2013)
- Deus Ex (2000)
- Metal Gear Solid series
- Supreme Ruler 2020 (2008)
- Nier Automata (2017)
- Red Faction (2001)

== See also ==
- Biopunk
- Cyberpunk derivatives
- Kathleen Ann Goonan
- Nanotechnology in fiction
- Posthuman
- Postcyberpunk
- Societal impact of nanotechnology
