= Regulation of nanotechnology =

Because of the ongoing controversy on the implications of nanotechnology, there is significant debate concerning whether nanotechnology or nanotechnology-based products merit special government regulation. This mainly relates to when to assess new substances prior to their release into the market, community and environment.

Nanotechnology refers to an increasing number of commercially available products – from socks and trousers to tennis racquets and cleaning cloths. Such nanotechnologies and their accompanying industries have triggered calls for increased community participation and effective regulatory arrangements. However, these calls have presently not led to such comprehensive regulation to oversee research and the commercial application of nanotechnologies, or any comprehensive labeling for products that contain nanoparticles or are derived from nano-processes.

Regulatory bodies such as the United States Environmental Protection Agency and the Food and Drug Administration in the U.S. or the Health and Consumer Protection Directorate of the European Commission have started dealing with the potential risks posed by nanoparticles. So far, neither engineered nanoparticles nor the products and materials that contain them are subject to any special regulation regarding production, handling or labelling.

== Managing risks: human and environmental health and safety ==
Studies of the health impact of airborne particles generally shown that for toxic materials, smaller particles are more toxic. This is due in part to the fact that, given the same mass per volume, the dose in terms of particle numbers increases as particle size decreases.

Based upon available data, it has been argued that current risk assessment methodologies are not suited to the hazards associated with nanoparticles; in particular, existing toxicological and eco-toxicological methods are not up to the task; exposure evaluation (dose) needs to be expressed as quantity of nanoparticles and/or surface area rather than simply mass; equipment for routine detecting and measuring nanoparticles in air, water, or soil is inadequate; and very little is known about the physiological responses to nanoparticles.

Regulatory bodies in the U.S. as well as in the EU have concluded that nanoparticles form the potential for an entirely new risk and that it is necessary to carry out an extensive analysis of the risk. The challenge for regulators is whether a matrix can be developed which would identify nanoparticles and more complex nanoformulations which are likely to have special toxicological properties or whether it is more reasonable for each particle or formulation to be tested separately.

The International Council on Nanotechnology maintains a database and Virtual Journal of scientific papers on environmental, health and safety research on nanoparticles. The database currently has over 2000 entries indexed by particle type, exposure pathway and other criteria. The Project on Emerging Nanotechnologies (PEN) currently lists 807 products that manufacturers have voluntarily identified that use nanotechnology. No labeling is required by the FDA so that number could be significantly higher. "The use of nanotechnology in consumer products and industrial applications is growing rapidly, with the products listed in the PEN inventory showing just the tip of the iceberg" according to PEN Project Director David Rejesk.

The Material Safety Data Sheet that must be issued for certain materials often does not differentiate between bulk and nanoscale size of the material in question and even when it does these MSDS are advisory only.

== Democratic governance ==
Many, such as the Nanotechnology Engagement group, argue that government has a responsibility to provide opportunities for the public to be involved in the development of new forms of science and technology. Community engagement can be achieved through various means or mechanisms such as referendums, consultation documents, and advisory committees that include community members and other stakeholders as possible governance structures for nanotechnologies. Other conventional approaches include public meetings and "closed" dialog with stakeholders. More contemporary engagement processes that have been employed to include community members in decisions about nanotechnology include citizens' juries and consensus conferences. Leach and Scoones argue that since that "most debates about science and technology options involve uncertainty, and often ignorance, public debate about regulatory regimes is essential."

It has been argued by researchers such as Diana M. Bowman, Graeme A. Hodge and Thomas A Faunce that limited nanotechnology labeling and regulation may exacerbate potential human and environmental health and safety issues associated with nanotechnology, and that the development of comprehensive regulation of nanotechnology will be vital to ensure that the potential risks associated with the research and commercial application of nanotechnology do not overshadow its potential benefits. Regulation may also be required to meet community expectations about responsible development of nanotechnology, as well as ensuring that public interests are included in shaping the development of nanotechnology.

Community education, engagement and consultation tend to occur "downstream": once there is at least a moderate level of awareness, and often during the process of disseminating and adapting technologies. "Upstream" engagement, by contrast, occurs much earlier in the innovation cycle and involves: "dialogue and debate about future technology options and pathways, bringing the often expert-led approaches to horizon scanning, technology foresight and scenario planning to involve a wider range of perspectives and inputs." Daniel Sarewitz Director of Arizona State University's Consortium on Science, Policy and Outcomes, argues that "by the time new devices reach the stage of commercialization and regulation, it is usually too late to alter them to correct problems." However, Xenos, et al. argue that upstream engagement can be utilized in this area through anticipated discussion with peers. Upstream engagement in this sense is meant to "create the best possible conditions for sound policy making and public judgments based on careful assessment of objective information". Discussion may act as a catalyst for upstream engagement by prompting accountability for individuals to seek and process additional information ("anticipatory elaboration"). However, though anticipated discussion did lead to participants seeking further information, Xenos et al. found that factual information was not primarily sought out; instead, individuals sought out opinion pieces and editorials.

The stance that the research, development and use of nanotechnology should be subject to control by the public sector, or that favors participatory politics to guide state intervention in the effort to manage the transition to a society revolutionized by molecular nanotechnology, is sometimes referred to as nanosocialism. The term was coined by USC professor David M. Berube, who argued that nanotechnological projections need to be tempered by technorealism about the implications of nanotechnology in a technocapitalist society, but that its applications also offer enormous opportunities for economic abundance and social progress.

=== Newness ===
The question of whether nanotechnology represents something 'new' must be answered to decide how best nanotechnology should be regulated. The Royal Society recommended that the UK government assess chemicals in the form of nanoparticles or nanotubes as new substances. Subsequent to this, in 2007 a coalition of over forty groups called for nanomaterials to be classified as new substances, and regulated as such.

Despite these recommendations, chemicals comprising nanoparticles that have previously been subject to assessment and regulation may be exempt from regulation, regardless of the potential for different risks and impacts. In contrast, nanomaterials are often recognized as 'new' from the perspective of intellectual property rights (IPRs), and as such are commercially protected via patenting laws.

There is significant debate about who is responsible for the regulation of nanotechnology. While some non-nanotechnology specific regulatory agencies currently cover some products and processes (to varying degrees) – by "bolting on" nanotechnology to existing regulations – there are clear gaps in these regimes. This enables some nanotechnology applications to figuratively "slip through the cracks" without being covered by any regulations. An example of this has occurred in the US, and involves nanoparticles of titanium dioxide (TiO_{2}) for use in sunscreen where they create a clearer cosmetic appearance. In this case, the US Food and Drug Administration (FDA) reviewed the immediate health effects of exposure to nanoparticles of TiO_{2} for consumers. However, they did not review its impacts for aquatic ecosystems when the sunscreen rubs off, nor did the EPA, or any other agency.

Similarly the Australian equivalent of the FDA, the Therapeutic Goods Administration (TGA) approved the use of nanoparticles in sunscreens (without the requirement for package labelling) after a thorough review of the literature, on the basis that although nanoparticles of TiO_{2} and zinc oxide (ZnO) in sunscreens do produce free radicals and oxidative DNA damage in vitro, such particles were unlikely to pass the dead outer cells of the stratum corneum of human skin; a finding which some academics have argued seemed not to apply the precautionary principle in relation to prolonged use on children with cut skin, the elderly with thin skin, people with diseased skin or use over flexural creases. Doubts over the TGA's decision were raised with publication of a paper showing that the uncoated anatase form of TiO_{2} used in some Australian sunscreens caused a photocatalytic reaction that degraded the surface of newly installed prepainted steel roofs in places where they came in contact with the sunscreen coated hands of workmen. Such gaps in regulation are likely to continue alongside the development and commercialization of increasingly complex second and third generation nanotechnologies.

Nanomedicines are just beginning to enter drug regulatory processes, but within a few decades could comprise a dominant group within the class of innovative pharmaceuticals, the current thinking of government safety and cost-effectiveness regulators appearing to be that these products give rise to few if any nano-specific issues. Some academics (such as Thomas Alured Faunce) have challenged that proposition and suggest that nanomedicines may create unique or heightened policy challenges for government systems of cost-effectiveness as well as safety regulation. There are also significant public good aspects to the regulation of nanotechnology, particularly with regard to ensuring that industry involvement in standard-setting does not become a means of reducing competition and that nanotechnology policy and regulation encourages new models of safe drug discovery and development more systematically targeted at the global burden of disease.

Self-regulation attempts may well fail, due to the inherent conflict of interest in asking any organization to police itself. If the public becomes aware of this failure, an external, independent organization is often given the duty of policing them, sometimes with highly punitive measures taken against the organization. The Food and Drug Administration notes that it only regulates on the basis of voluntary claims made by the product manufacturer. If no claims are made by a manufacturer, then the FDA may be unaware of nanotechnology being employed.

Yet regulations worldwide still fail to distinguish between materials in their nanoscale and bulk form. This means that nanomaterials remain effectively unregulated; there is no regulatory requirement for nanomaterials to face new health and safety testing or environmental impact assessment prior to their use in commercial products, if these materials have already been approved in bulk form. The health risks of nanomaterials are of particular concern for workers who may face occupational exposure to nanomaterials at higher levels, and on a more routine basis, than the general public.

=== International law ===
There is no international regulation of nanoproducts or the underlying nanotechnology. Nor are there any internationally agreed definitions or terminology for nanotechnology, no internationally agreed protocols for toxicity testing of nanoparticles, and no standardized protocols for evaluating the environmental impacts of nanoparticles. Moreover, nanomaterials do not fall within the scope of existing international treaties regulating toxic chemicals.

Since products that are produced using nanotechnologies will likely enter international trade, it is argued that it will be necessary to harmonize nanotechnology standards across national borders. There is concern that some countries, most notably developing countries, will be excluded from international standards negotiations. The Institute for Food and Agricultural Standards notes that "developing countries should have a say in international nanotechnology standards development, even if they lack capacity to enforce the standards".

Concerns about monopolies and concentrated control and ownership of new nanotechnologies were raised in community workshops in Australia in 2004.

== Arguments against regulation ==
Wide use of the term nanotechnology in recent years has created the impression that regulatory frameworks are suddenly having to contend with entirely new challenges that they are unequipped to deal with. Many regulatory systems around the world already assess new substances or products for safety on a case by case basis, before they are permitted on the market. These regulatory systems have been assessing the safety of nanometre scale molecular arrangements for many years and many substances comprising nanometre scale particles have been in use for decades e.g. Carbon black, Titanium dioxide, Zinc oxide, Bentonite, Aluminum silicate, Iron oxides, Silicon dioxide, Diatomaceous earth, Kaolin, Talc, Montmorillonite, Magnesium oxide, Copper sulphate.

These existing approval frameworks almost universally use the best available science to assess safety and do not approve substances or products with an unacceptable risk benefit profile. One proposal is to simply treat particle size as one of the several parameters defining a substance to be approved, rather than creating special rules for all particles of a given size regardless of type. A major argument against special regulation of nanotechnology is that the projected applications with the greatest impact are far in the future, and it is unclear how to regulate technologies whose feasibility is speculative at this point. In the meantime, it has been argued that the immediate applications of nanomaterials raise challenges not much different from those of introducing any other new material, and can be dealt with by minor tweaks to existing regulatory schemes rather than sweeping regulation of entire scientific fields.

A truly precautionary approach to regulation could severely impede development in the field of nanotechnology safety studies are required for each and every nanoscience application. While the outcome of these studies can form the basis for government and international regulations, a more reasonable approach might be development of a risk matrix that identifies likely culprits.

== Response from governments ==
=== United Kingdom ===
In its seminal 2004 report Nanoscience and Nanotechnologies: Opportunities and Uncertainties, the United Kingdom's Royal Society concluded that:

Many nanotechnologies pose no new risks to health and almost all the concerns relate to the potential impacts of deliberately manufactured nanoparticles and nanotubes that are free rather than fixed to or within a material... We expect the likelihood of nanoparticles or nanotubes being released from products in which they have been fixed or embedded (such as composites) to be low but have recommended that manufacturers assess this potential exposure risk for the lifecycle of the product and make their findings available to the relevant regulatory bodies... It is very unlikely that new manufactured nanoparticles could be introduced into humans in doses sufficient to cause the health effects that have been associated with [normal air pollution].

but have recommended that nanomaterials be regulated as new chemicals, that research laboratories and factories treat nanomaterials "as if they were hazardous", that release of nanomaterials into the environment be avoided as far as possible, and that products containing nanomaterials be subject to new safety testing requirements prior to their commercial release.

The 2004 report by the UK Royal Society and Royal Academy of Engineers noted that existing UK regulations did not require additional testing when existing substances were produced in nanoparticulate form. The Royal Society recommended that such regulations were revised so that "chemicals produced in the form of nanoparticles and nanotubes be treated as new chemicals under these regulatory frameworks" (p.xi). They also recommended that existing regulation be modified on a precautionary basis because they expect that "the toxicity of chemicals in the form of free nanoparticles and nanotubes cannot be predicted from their toxicity in a larger form and... in some cases they will be more toxic than the same mass of the same chemical in larger form."

The Better Regulation Commission's earlier 2003 report had recommended that the UK Government:

1. enable, through an informed debate, the public to consider the risks for themselves, and help them to make their own decisions by providing suitable information;
2. be open about how it makes decisions, and acknowledge where there are uncertainties;
3. communicate with, and involve as far as possible, the public in the decision making process;
4. ensure it develops two-way communication channels; and
5. take a strong lead over the handling of any risk issues, particularly information provision and policy implementation.

These recommendations were accepted in principle by the UK Government. Noting that there was "no obvious focus for an informed public debate of the type suggested by the Task Force", the UK government's response was to accept the recommendations.

The Royal Society's 2004 report identified two distinct governance issues:

1. the "role and behaviour of institutions" and their ability to "minimise unintended consequences" through adequate regulation and
2. the extent to which the public can trust and play a role in determining the trajectories that nanotechnologies may follow as they develop.

=== United States ===
Rather than adopt a new nano-specific regulatory framework, the United States' Food and Drug Administration (FDA) convenes an 'interest group' each quarter with representatives of FDA centers that have responsibility for assessment and regulation of different substances and products. This interest group ensures coordination and communication. A September 2009 FDA document called for identifying sources of nanomaterials, how they move in the environment, the problems they might cause for people, animals and plants, and how these problems could be avoided or mitigated.

The Bush administration in 2007 decided that no special regulations or labeling of nanoparticles were required. Critics derided this as treating consumers like a "guinea pig" without sufficient notice due to lack of labelling.

Berkeley, CA is currently the only city in the United States to regulate nanotechnology. Cambridge, MA in 2008 considered enacting a similar law, but the committee it instituted to study the issue Cambridge recommended against regulation in its final report, recommending instead other steps to facilitate information-gathering about potential effects of nanomaterials.

On December 10, 2008, the U.S. National Research Council released a report calling for more regulation of nanotechnology.

==== California ====
Assembly Bill (AB) 289 (2006) authorizes the Department of Toxic Substances Control (DTSC) within the California Environmental Protection Agency and other agencies to request information on environmental and health impacts from chemical manufacturers and importers, including testing techniques.

=== California ===
In October 2008, the Department of Toxic Substances Control (DTSC), within the California Environmental Protection Agency, announced its intent to request information regarding analytical test methods, fate and transport in the environment, and other relevant information from manufacturers of carbon nanotubes. DTSC is exercising its authority under the California Health and Safety Code, Chapter 699, sections 57018-57020. These sections were added as a result of the adoption of Assembly Bill AB 289 (2006). They are intended to make information on the fate and transport, detection and analysis, and other information on chemicals more available. The law places the responsibility to provide this information to the Department on those who manufacture or import the chemicals.

On January 22, 2009, a formal information request letter was sent to manufacturers who produce or import carbon nanotubes in California, or who may export carbon nanotubes into the State. This letter constitutes the first formal implementation of the authorities placed into statute by AB 289 and is directed to manufacturers of carbon nanotubes, both industry and academia within the State, and to manufacturers outside California who export carbon nanotubes to California. This request for information must be met by the manufacturers within one year. DTSC is waiting for the upcoming January 22, 2010 deadline for responses to the data call-in.

The California Nano Industry Network and DTSC hosted a full-day symposium on November 16, 2009 in Sacramento, CA. This symposium provided an opportunity to hear from nanotechnology industry experts and discuss future regulatory considerations in California.

On December 21, 2010, the Department of Toxic Substances Control (DTSC) initiated the second Chemical Information Call-in for six nanomaterials: nano cerium oxide, nano silver, nano titanium dioxide, nano zero valent iron, nano zinc oxide, and quantum dots. DTSC sent a formal information request letter to forty manufacturers who produce or import the six nanomaterials in California, or who may export them into the State. The Chemical Information Call-in is meant to identify information gaps of these six nanomaterials and to develop further knowledge of their analytical test methods, fate and transport in the environment, and other relevant information under California Health and Safety Code, Chapter 699, sections 57018-57020. DTSC completed the carbon nanotube information call-in in June 2010.

DTSC partners with University of California, Los Angeles (UCLA), Santa Barbara (UCSB), and Riverside (UCR), University of Southern California (USC), Stanford University, Center for Environmental Implications of Nanotechnology (CEIN), and The National Institute for Occupational Safety and Health (NIOSH) on safe nanomaterial handling practices.

DTSC is interested in expanding the Chemical Information Call-in to members of the brominated flame retardants, members of the methyl siloxanes, ocean plastics, nano-clay, and other emerging chemicals.

=== European Union ===
The European Union has formed a group to study the implications of nanotechnology called the Scientific Committee on Emerging and Newly Identified Health Risks which has published a list of risks associated with nanoparticles.

Consequently, manufacturers and importers of carbon products, including carbon nano-tubes will have to submit full health and safety data within a year or so in order to comply with REACH.

A number of European member states have called for the creation of either national or European nanomaterials registries. France, Belgium, Sweden, and Denmark have established national registries of nanomaterials. In addition, the European Commission requested the Europeach Chemicals Agency (ECHA) to create a European Union Observatory for Nanomaterials (EUON) that aims at collecting publicly available information on the safety and markets of nanomaterials and nanotechnology.

== Response from advocacy groups ==
In January 2008, a coalition of over 40 civil society groups endorsed a statement of principles calling for precautionary action related to nanotechnology. The coalition called for strong, comprehensive oversight of the new technology and its products in the International Center for Technology Assessment's report Principles for the Oversight of Nanotechnologies and Nano materials, which states:

Hundreds of consumer products incorporating nano-materials are now on the market, including cosmetics, sunscreens, sporting goods, clothing, electronics, baby and infant products, and food and food packaging. But evidence indicates that current nano-materials may pose significant health, safety, and environmental hazards. In addition, the profound social, economic, and ethical challenges posed by nano-scale technologies have yet to be addressed ... 'Since there is currently no government oversight and no labeling requirements for nano-products anywhere in the world, no one knows when they are exposed to potential nano-tech risks and no one is monitoring for potential health or environmental harm. That's why we believe oversight action based on our principles is urgent' ... This industrial boom is creating a growing nano-workforce which is predicted to reach two million globally by 2015. 'Even though potential health hazards stemming from exposure have been clearly identified, there are no mandatory workplace measures that require exposures to be assessed, workers to be trained, or control measures to be implemented,' explained Bill Kojola of the AFL-CIO. 'This technology should not be rushed to market until these failings are corrected and workers assured of their safety'."

The group has urged action based on eight principles. They are (1) A Precautionary Foundation (2) Mandatory Nano-specific Regulations (3) Health and Safety of the Public and Workers (4) Environmental Protection (5) Transparency (6) Public Participation (7) Inclusion of Broader Impacts and (8) Manufacturer Liability.

Some NGOs, including Friends of the Earth, are calling for the formation of a separate nanotechnology specific regulatory framework for the regulation of nanotechnology. In Australia, Friends of the Earth propose the establishment of a Nanotechnology Regulatory Coordination Agency, overseen by a Foresight and Technology Assessment Board. The advantage of this arrangement is that it could ensure a centralized body of experts that are able to provide oversight across the range of nano-products and sectors. It is also argued that a centralized regulatory approach would simplify the regulatory environment, thereby supporting industry innovation. A National Nanotechnology Regulator could coordinate existing regulations related to nanotechnology (including intellectual property, civil liberties, product safety, occupation health and safety, environmental and international law). Regulatory mechanisms could vary from "hard law at one extreme through licensing and codes of practice to 'soft' self-regulation and negotiation in order to influence behavior." The formation of national nanotechnology regulatory bodies may also assist in establishing global regulatory frameworks.

In early 2008, The UK's largest organic certifier, the Soil Association, announced that its organic standard would exclude nanotechnology, recognizing the associated human and environmental health and safety risks. Certified organic standards in Australia exclude engineered nanoparticles. It appears likely that other organic certifiers will also follow suit. The Soil Association was also the first to declare organic standards free from genetic engineering.

== Technical aspects ==
=== Size ===
Regulation of nanotechnology will require a definition of the size, in which particles and processes are recognized as operating at the nano-scale. The size-defining characteristic of nanotechnology is the subject of significant debate, and varies to include particles and materials in the scale of at least 100 to 300 nanometers (nm). Friends of the Earth Australia recommend defining nano-particles up to 300 nanometers (nm) in size. They argue that "particles up to a few hundred nanometers in size share many of the novel biological behaviors of nano-particles, including novel toxicity risks", and that "nano-materials up to approximately 300 nm in size can be taken up by individual cells". The UK Soil Association define nanotechnology to include manufactured nano-particles where the mean particle size is 200 nm or smaller. The U.S. National Nanotechnology Initiative defines nanotechnology as "the understanding and control of matter at dimensions of roughly 1 to 100 nm.

=== Mass thresholds ===
Regulatory frameworks for chemicals tend to be triggered by mass thresholds. This is certainly the case for the management of toxic chemicals in Australia through the National pollutant inventory. However, in the case of nanotechnology, nano-particle applications are unlikely to exceed these thresholds (tonnes/kilograms) due to the size and weight of nano-particles. As such, the Woodrow Wilson International Center for Scholars questions the usefulness of regulating nanotechnologies on the basis of their size/weight alone. They argue, for example, that the toxicity of nano-participles is more related to surface area than weight, and that emerging regulations should also take account of such factors.
