= International Center for Technology Assessment =

U.S. non-profit organization

The International Center for Technology Assessment (ICTA) is a U.S. non-profit bi-partisan organization, based in Washington, D.C.

ICTA was formed in 1994. Its executive director is Andrew Kimbrell. Its sister organization is the Center for Food Safety.

In 2004, ICTA took an active part in Monsanto Canada Inc. v. Schmeiser, a leading Supreme Court of Canada case on patent rights for biotechnology. The case involved Percy Schmeiser, a Saskatchewan canola farmer. Intervening on Schmeiser’s behalf were a consortium of six non-government organizations, among which was the International Center for Technology Assessment. Schmeiser lost the case.

In 2006, Friends of the Earth and ICTA filed a formal petition with the Food and Drug Administration urging better monitoring and regulation of cosmetic and toiletry products containing nanoparticles, and stating that they would sue the FDA if it did not take adequate action in 180 days.

== See also ==
- Implications of nanotechnology
- Nanotoxicology
- Regulation of nanotechnology
- Environmental implications of nanotechnology
- Health implications of nanotechnology
- Genetically modified food controversies
- Polly the sheep
- Institute on Biotechnology and the Human Future

== Bibliography ==
- Principles for the Oversight of Nanotechnologies and Nanomaterials (PDF file) ICTA - January 31, 2008
