= Emerging technologies =

Technology still to be fully developed

Emerging technologies are technologies whose development, practical applications, or both are still largely unrealized. These technologies are generally new but also include old technologies finding new applications. Emerging technologies are often perceived as capable of changing the status quo.

Emerging technologies are characterized by radical novelty (in application even if not in origins), relatively fast growth, coherence, prominent impact, and uncertainty and ambiguity.

Emerging technologies include a variety of technologies such as information technology, nanotechnology, biotechnology, robotics, and artificial intelligence. New technological fields may result from the technological convergence of different systems evolving towards similar goals. Convergence brings previously separate technologies such as voice (and telephony features), data (and productivity applications) and video together so that they share resources and interact with each other, creating new efficiencies.

Emerging technologies are those technical innovations which represent progressive developments within a field for competitive advantage; converging technologies represent previously distinct fields which are in some way moving towards stronger inter-connection and similar goals. However, the opinion on the degree of the impact, status and economic viability of several emerging and converging technologies varies.

== History of emerging technologies ==
In the history of technology, emerging technologies are contemporary advances and innovation in various fields of technology.

Over centuries innovative methods and new technologies have been developed and opened up. Some of these technologies are due to theoretical research, and others from commercial research and development.

Technological growth includes incremental developments and disruptive technologies. An example of the former was the gradual roll-out of DVD (digital video disc) as a development intended to follow on from the previous optical technology compact disc. By contrast, disruptive technologies are those where a new method replaces the previous technology and makes it redundant, for example, the replacement of horse-drawn carriages by automobiles and other vehicles.

== Emerging technology debates ==
Many writers, including computer scientist Bill Joy, have identified clusters of technologies that they consider critical to humanity's future. Joy warns that the technology could be used by elites for good or evil. They could use it as "good shepherds" for the rest of humanity or decide everyone else is superfluous and push for the mass extinction of those made unnecessary by technology.

Advocates of the benefits of technological change typically see emerging and converging technologies as offering hope for the betterment of the human condition. Cyberphilosophers Alexander Bard and Jan Söderqvist argue in The Futurica Trilogy that while Man himself is basically constant throughout human history (genes change very slowly), all relevant change is rather a direct or indirect result of technological innovation (memes change very fast) since new ideas always emanate from technology use and not the other way around. Man should consequently be regarded as history's main constant and technology as its main variable. However, critics of the risks of technological change, and even some advocates such as transhumanist philosopher Nick Bostrom, warn that some of these technologies could pose dangers, perhaps even contribute to the extinction of humanity itself; i.e., some of them could involve existential risks.

Much ethical debate centers on issues of distributive justice in allocating access to beneficial forms of technology. Some thinkers, including environmental ethicist Bill McKibben, oppose the continuing development of advanced technology partly out of fear that its benefits will be distributed unequally in ways that could worsen the plight of the poor. By contrast, inventor Ray Kurzweil is among techno-utopians who believe that emerging and converging technologies could and will eliminate poverty and abolish suffering.

Some analysts such as Martin Ford argue that as information technology advances, robots and other forms of automation will ultimately result in significant unemployment as machines and software begin to match and exceed the capability of workers to perform most routine jobs.

As robotics and artificial intelligence develop further, even many skilled jobs may be threatened. Technologies such as machine learning may ultimately allow computers to do many knowledge-based jobs that require significant education. This may result in substantial unemployment at all skill levels, stagnant or falling wages for most workers, and increased concentration of income and wealth as the owners of capital capture an ever-larger fraction of the economy. This in turn could lead to depressed consumer spending and economic growth as the bulk of the population lacks sufficient discretionary income to purchase the products and services produced by the economy.

Emerging technologies

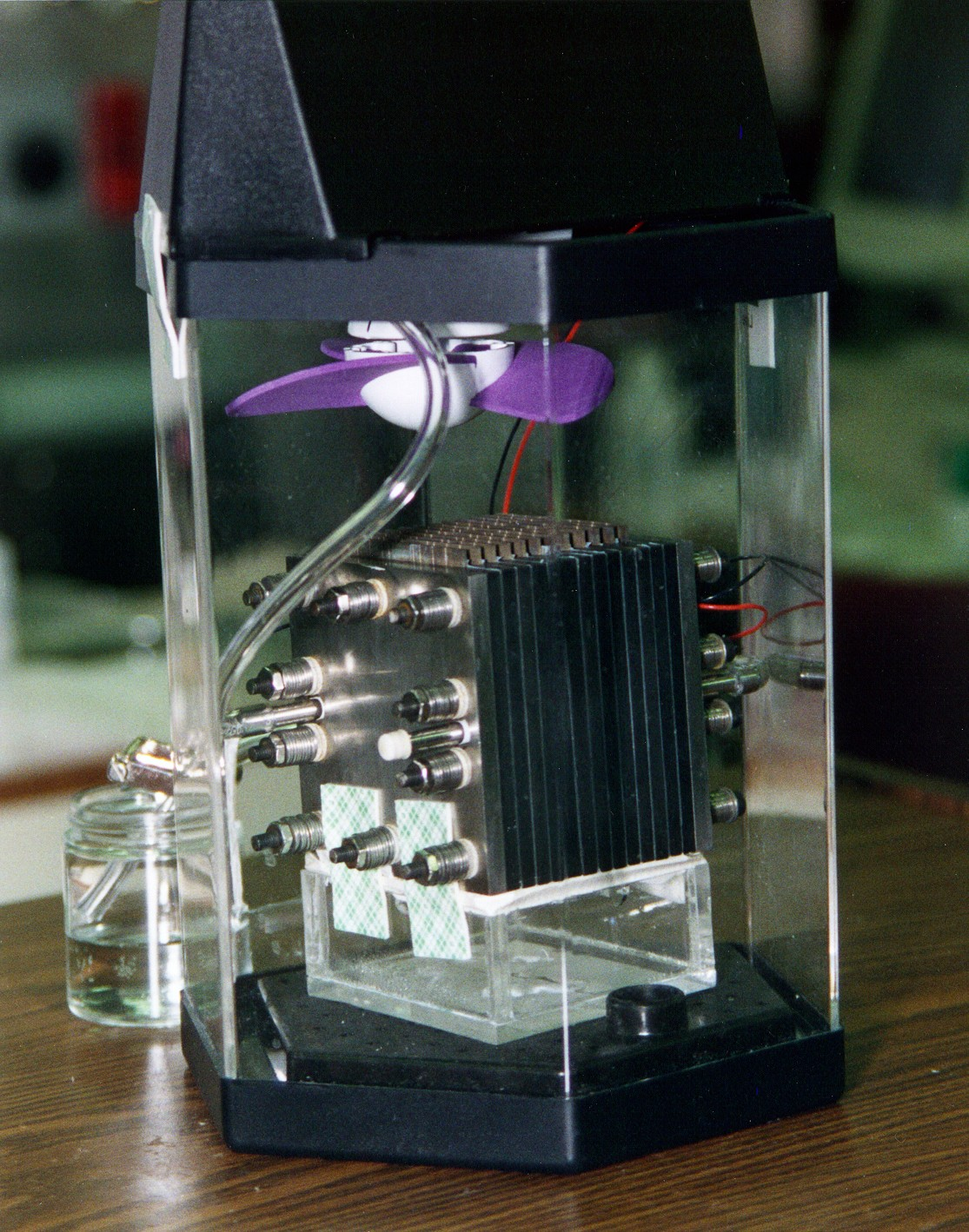
NASA Fuel cell stack
Direct-methanol cell

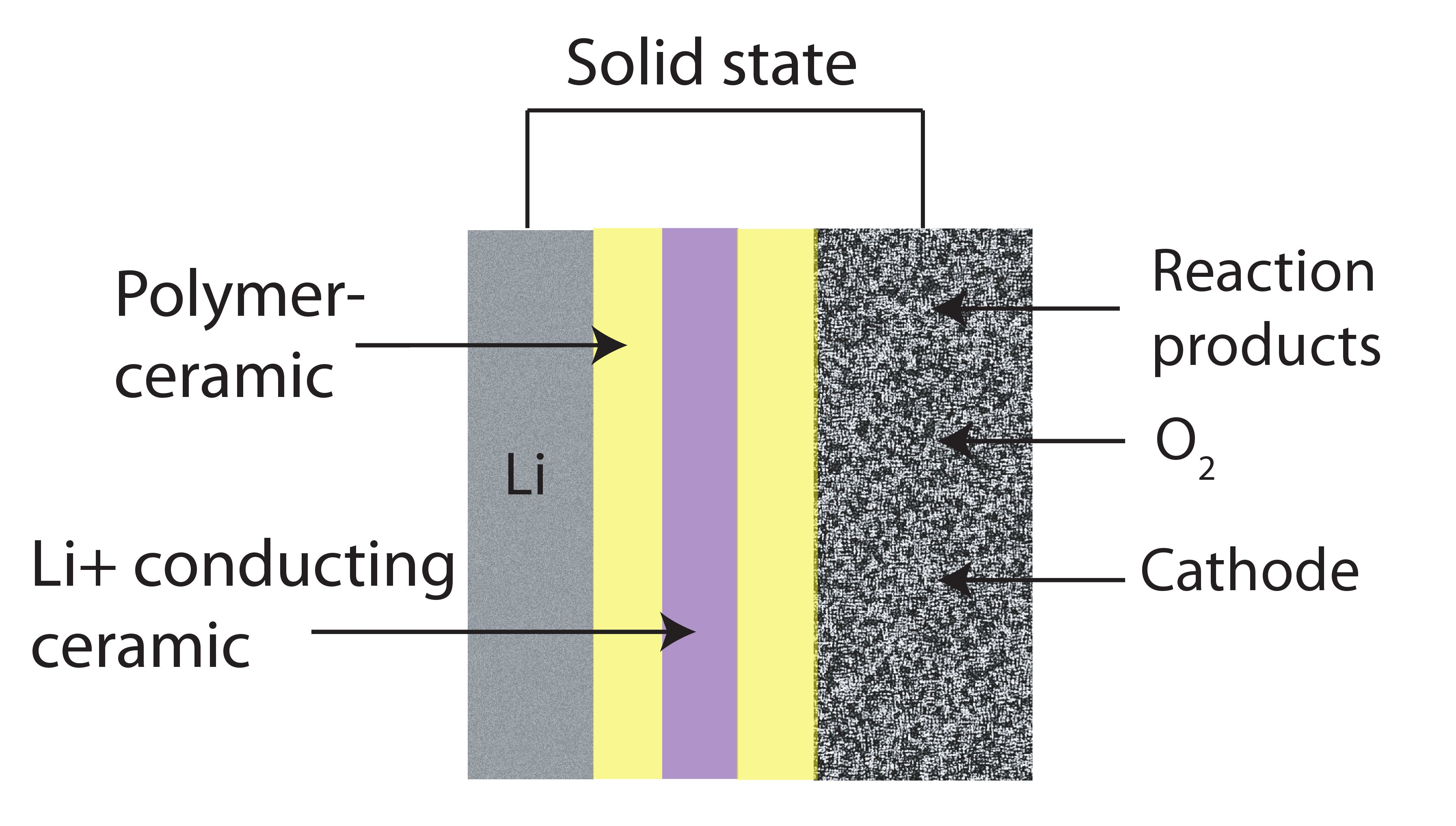
Solid-state air batteries
Li-Air composition

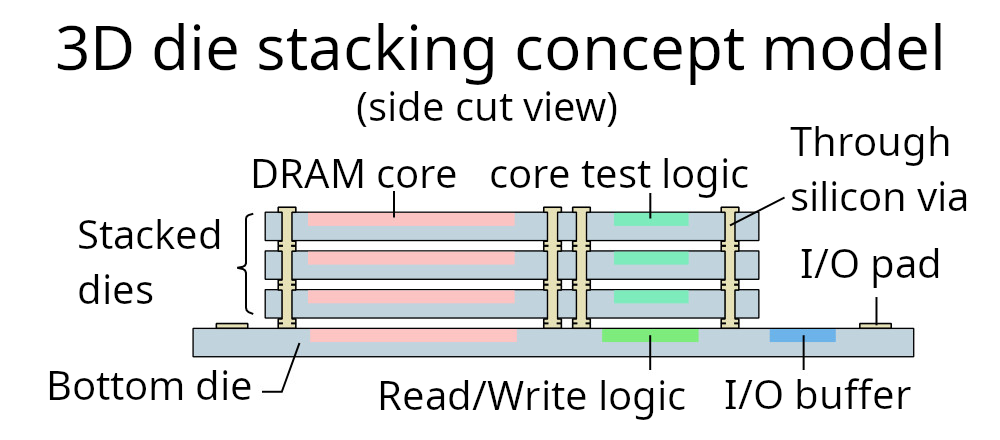
3D IC components
A base chip carrying a stack of directly-connected chips

The Semantic Web Stack
Semantic layer architecture

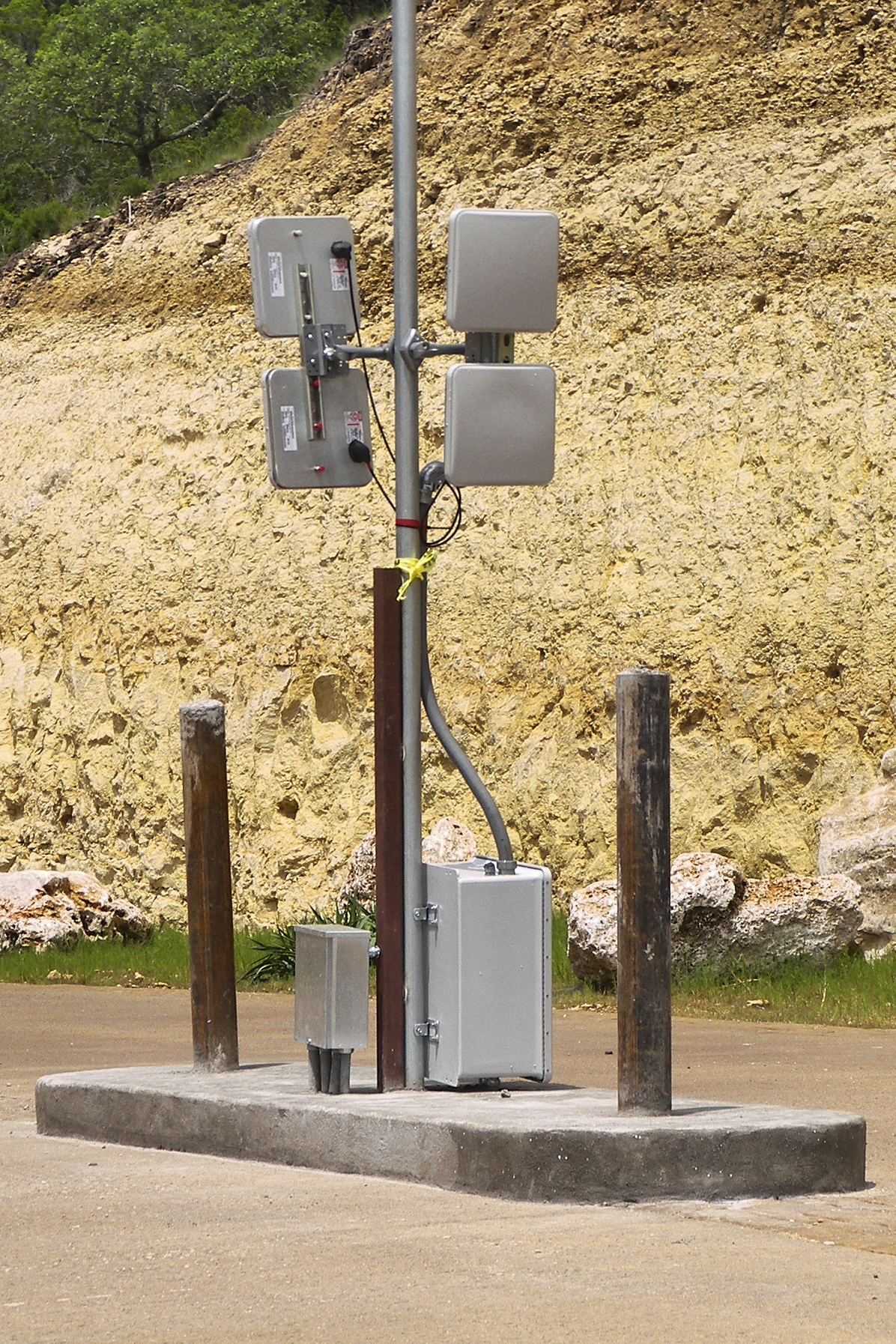
RFID Transceivers
Activates passive RFID chip

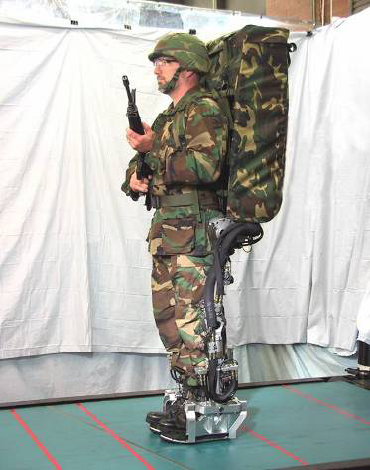
DARPA Power armatura
Electromechanical exoskeleton

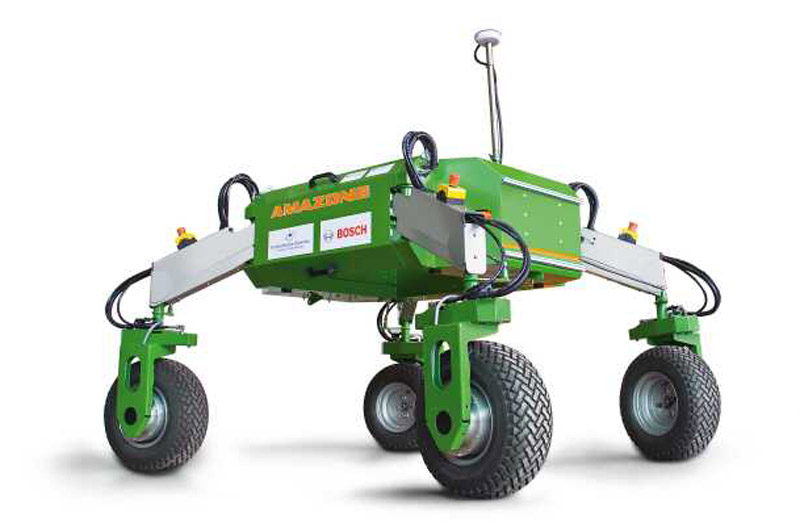
Agri-robot farming
Cultivation 'bots and husbandry

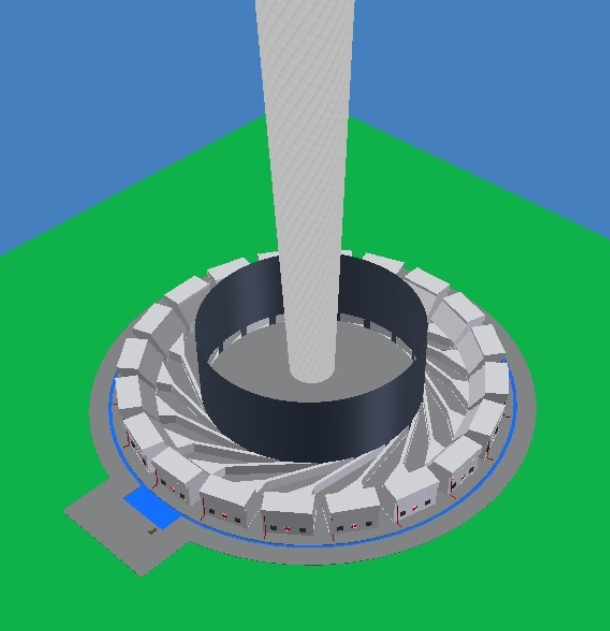
Atmo-vortex engines
Vortex generators

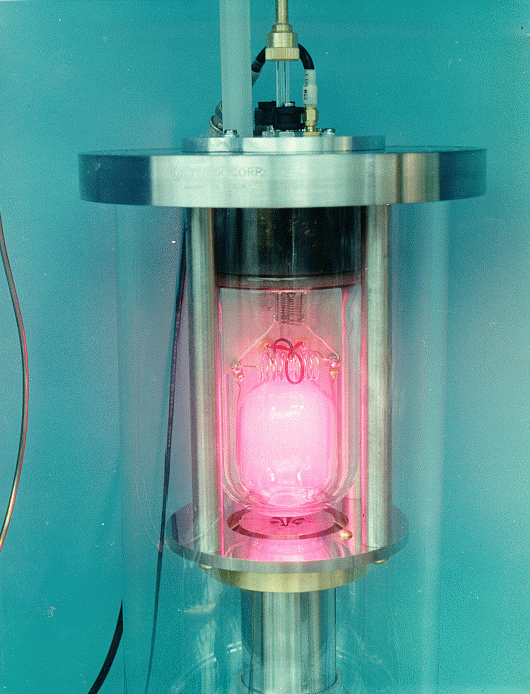
Electromagnetic weapons
Hydrogen rf plasma discharger

== Examples of emerging technologies ==
=== Artificial intelligence ===
Artificial intelligence (AI) is the sub intelligence exhibited by machines or software, and the branch of computer science that develops machines and software with animal-like intelligence. Major AI researchers and textbooks define the field as "the study and design of intelligent agents," where an intelligent agent is a system that perceives its environment and takes actions that maximize its chances of success. John McCarthy, who coined the term in 1956, defines it as "the study of making intelligent machines".

The central functions (or goals) of AI research include reasoning, knowledge, planning, learning, natural language processing (communication), perception and the ability to move and manipulate objects. General intelligence (or "strong AI") is still among the field's long-term goals. Currently, popular approaches include deep learning, statistical methods, computational intelligence and traditional symbolic AI. There is an enormous number of tools used in AI, including versions of search and mathematical optimization, logic, methods based on probability and economics, and many others.

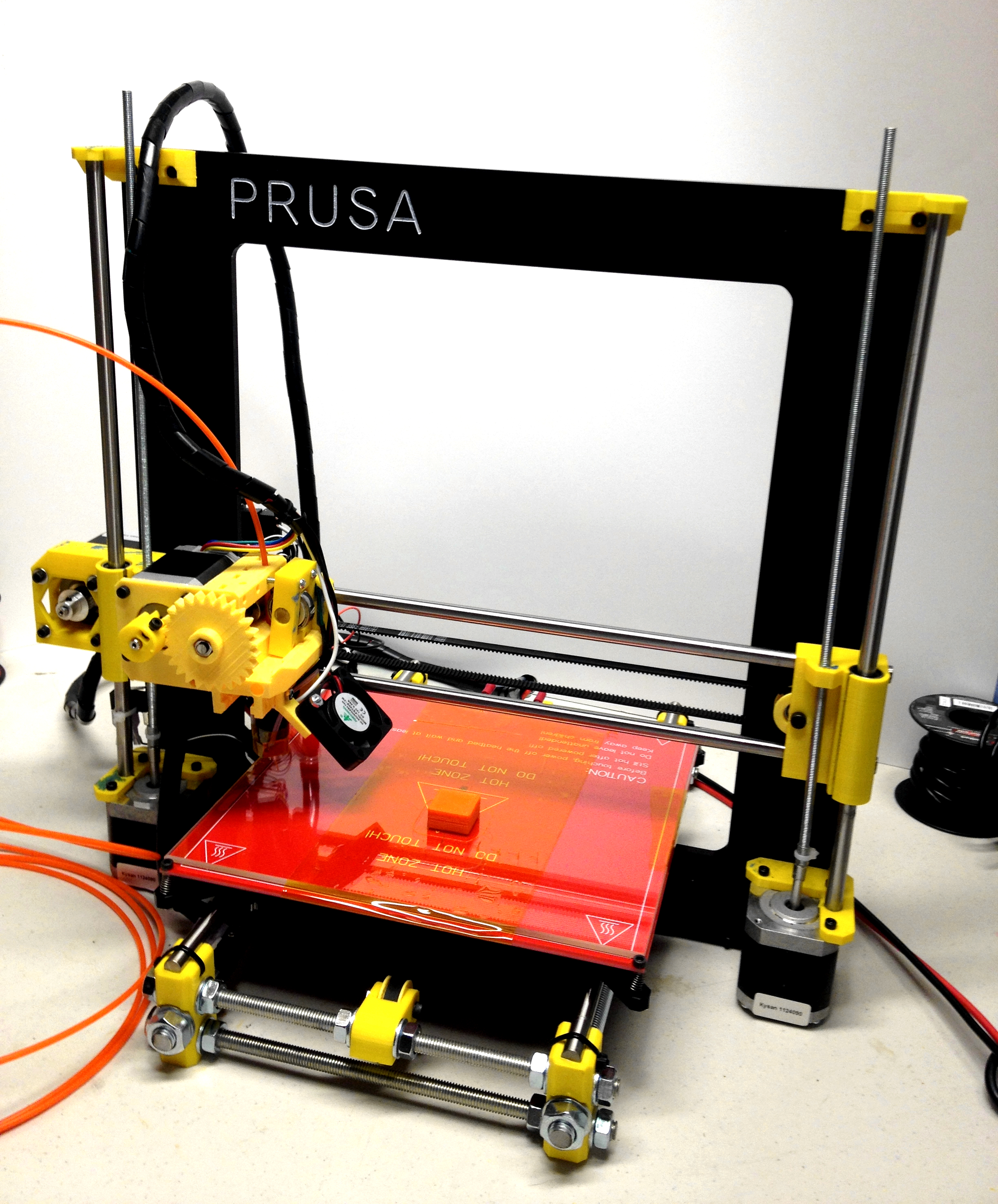
3D printer

=== 3D printing ===
3D printing, also known as additive manufacturing, has been posited by Jeremy Rifkin and others as part of the third industrial revolution.

Combined with Internet technology, 3D printing allows for digital blueprints of various material products to be sent instantly to another person to be produced on the spot.

Although this technology is still too crude to produce most products, it is rapidly developing and created a controversy in 2013 around the issue of 3D printed firearms.

=== Gene therapy ===
Gene therapy was first successfully demonstrated in late 1990/early 1991 for adenosine deaminase deficiency, though the treatment was somatic – that is, did not affect the patient's germ line and thus was not heritable. This led the way to treatments for other genetic diseases and increased interest in germ line gene therapy – therapy affecting the gametes and descendants of patients.

Between September 1990 and January 2014, there were around 2,000 gene therapy trials conducted or approved.

=== Cancer vaccines ===
A cancer vaccine is a vaccine that treats existing cancer or prevents the development of cancer in certain high-risk individuals. Vaccines that treat existing cancer are known as therapeutic cancer vaccines. There are currently no vaccines able to prevent cancer in general.

On April 14, 2009, The Dendreon Corporation announced that their Phase III clinical trial of Provenge, a cancer vaccine designed to treat prostate cancer, had demonstrated an increase in survival. It received U.S. Food and Drug Administration (FDA) approval for use in the treatment of advanced prostate cancer patients on April 29, 2010. The approval of Provenge has stimulated interest in this type of therapy.

=== Cultured meat ===
Cultured meat, also called in vitro meat, clean meat, cruelty-free meat, shmeat, and test-tube meat, is an animal-flesh product that has never been part of a living animal with exception of the fetal calf serum taken from a slaughtered cow. In the 21st century, several research projects have worked on in vitro meat in the laboratory. The first in vitro beefburger, created by a Dutch team, was eaten at a demonstration for the press in London in August 2013. There remain difficulties to be overcome before in vitro meat becomes commercially available. Cultured meat is prohibitively expensive, but it is expected that the cost could be reduced to compete with that of conventionally obtained meat as technology improves. In vitro meat is also an ethical issue. Some argue that it is less objectionable than traditionally obtained meat because it does not involve killing and reduces the risk of animal cruelty, while others disagree with eating meat that has not developed naturally.

=== Nanotechnology ===
Nanotechnology is the manipulation of matter on an atomic, molecular, and supramolecular scale. The earliest widespread description of nanotechnology referred to the particular technological goal of precisely manipulating atoms and molecules for fabrication of macroscale products, also now referred to as molecular nanotechnology. A more generalized description of nanotechnology was subsequently established by the National Nanotechnology Initiative, which defines nanotechnology as the manipulation of matter with at least one dimension sized from 1 to 100 nanometers. This definition reflects the fact that quantum mechanical effects are important at this scale, and so the definition shifted from a particular technological goal to a research category inclusive of all types of research and technologies that deal with the special properties of matter that occur below the given size threshold.

=== Robotics ===
Robotics is the branch of technology that deals with the design, construction, operation, and application of robots, as well as computer systems for their control, sensory feedback, and information processing. These technologies deal with automated machines that can take the place of humans in dangerous environments, factories, warehouses, or kitchens; or resemble humans in appearance, behavior, and/or cognition. A good example of a robot that resembles humans is Sophia, a social humanoid robot developed by Hong Kong-based company Hanson Robotics which was activated on April 19, 2015. Many of today's robots are inspired by nature contributing to the field of bio-inspired robotics.

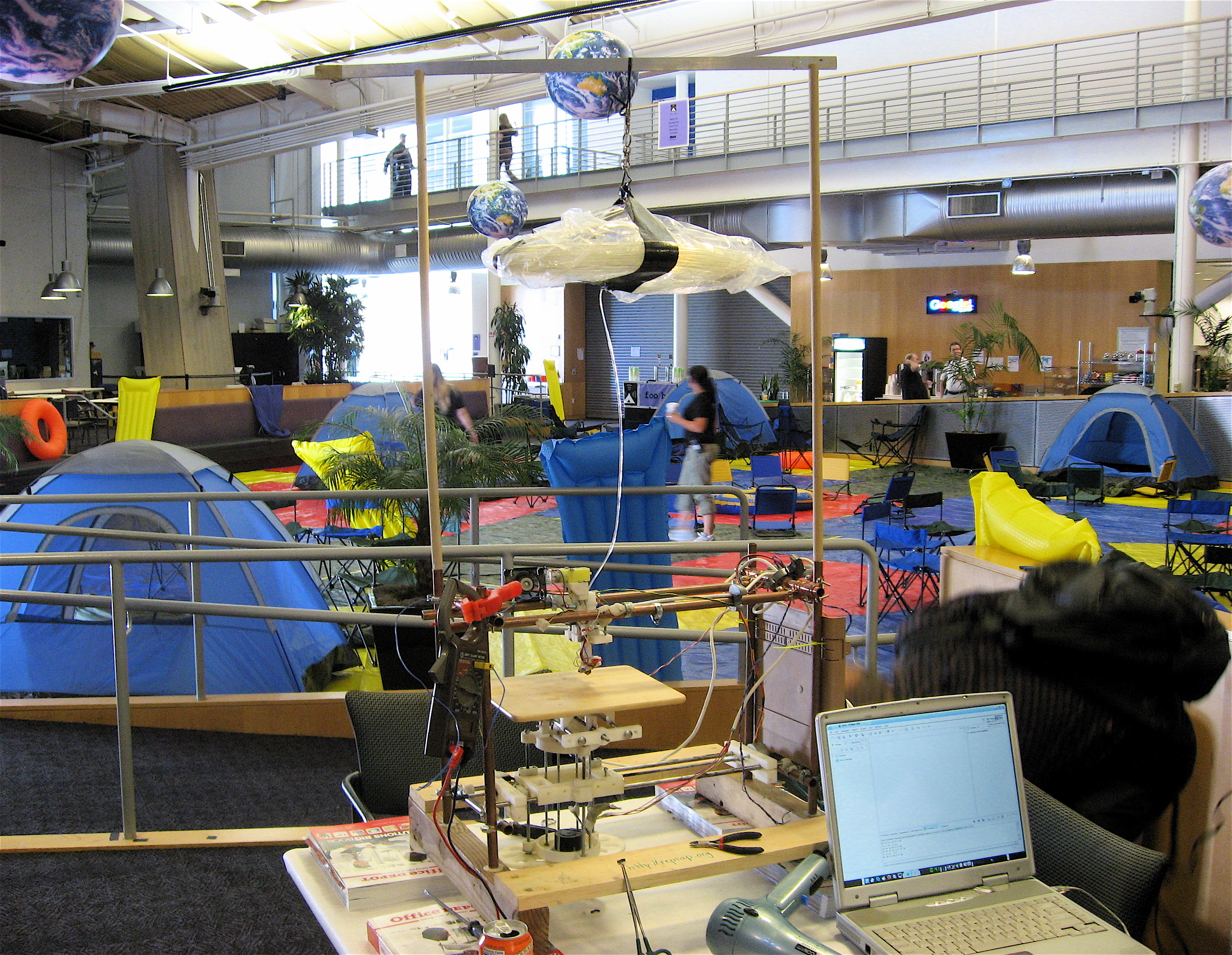
Self-replicating 3D printer

=== Stem-cell therapy ===
Stem cell therapy is an intervention strategy that introduces new adult stem cells into damaged tissue in order to treat disease or injury. Many medical researchers believe that stem cell treatments have the potential to change the face of human disease and alleviate suffering. The ability of stem cells to self-renew and give rise to subsequent generations with variable degrees of differentiation capacities offers significant potential for generation of tissues that can potentially replace diseased and damaged areas in the body, with minimal risk of rejection and side effects.

Chimeric antigen receptor (CAR)-modified T cells have raised among other immunotherapies for cancer treatment, being implemented against B-cell malignancies. Despite the promising outcomes of this innovative technology, CAR-T cells are not exempt from limitations that must yet to be overcome in order to provide reliable and more efficient treatments against other types of cancer.

=== Distributed ledger technology ===
Distributed ledger or blockchain technology provides a transparent and immutable list of transactions. A wide range of uses has been proposed for where an open, decentralised database is required, ranging from supply chains to cryptocurrencies.

Smart contracts are self-executing transactions which occur when pre-defined conditions are met. The aim is to provide security that is superior to traditional contract law, and to reduce transaction costs and delays. The original idea was conceived by Nick Szabo in 1994, but remained unrealised until the development of blockchains.

=== Augmented reality ===
This technology, which overlays digital graphics onto live footage, has existed since the late 20th century. However, with the development of more powerful computing hardware and the growth of open-source software, its capabilities have expanded far beyond what was once thought possible. Today, it is widely used in applications such as Pokémon Go, Snapchat and Instagram filters, and other platforms that integrate fictional or digital elements into real-world environments.

=== Multi-use rockets ===
Reusable rockets, in contrast to single use rockets that are disposed after launch, are able to propulsively land safely in a pre-specified place where they are recovered to be used again in later launches. Early prototypes include the McDonnell Douglas DC-X tested in the 1990s, but the company SpaceX was the first to use propulsive reusability on the first stage of an operational orbital launch vehicle, the Falcon 9, in the 2010s. SpaceX is also developing a fully reusable rocket known as Starship. Other companies developing reusable rockets include Blue Origin and Rocket Lab.

== Development of emerging technologies ==
As innovation drives economic growth, and large economic rewards come from new inventions, a great deal of resources (funding and effort) go into the development of emerging technologies. Some of the sources of these resources are described below.

=== Research and development ===
Research and development is directed towards the advancement of technology in general, and therefore includes development of emerging technologies. See also List of countries by research and development spending.

Applied research is a form of systematic inquiry involving the practical application of science. It accesses and uses some part of the research communities' (the academia's) accumulated theories, knowledge, methods, and techniques, for a specific, often state-, business-, or client-driven purpose.

Science policy is the area of public policy which is concerned with the policies that affect the conduct of the science and research enterprise, including the funding of science, often in pursuance of other national policy goals such as technological innovation to promote commercial product development, weapons development, health care and environmental monitoring.

=== Patents ===
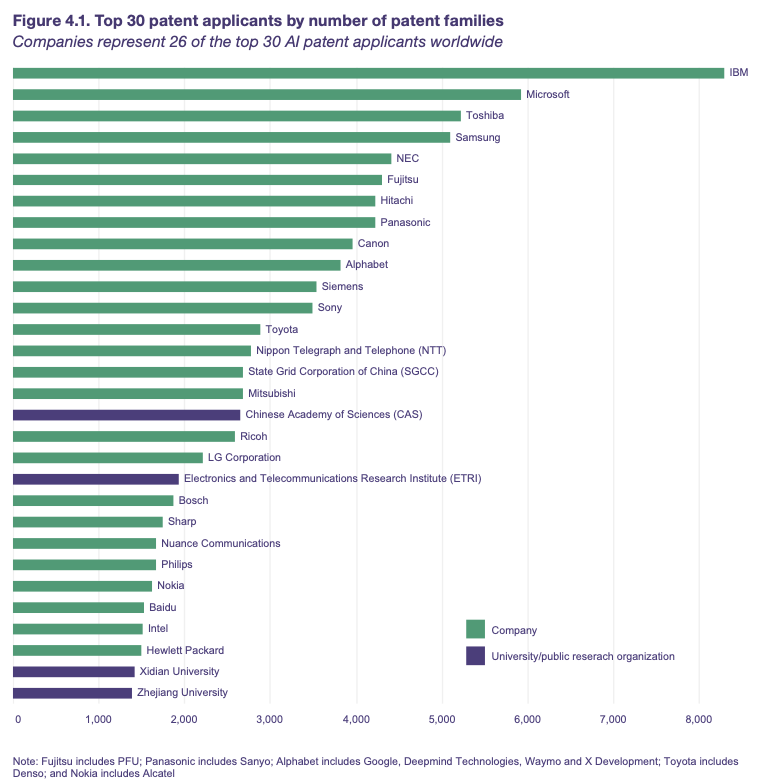
Top 30 AI patent applicants in 2016

Patents provide inventors with a limited period of time (minimum of 20 years, but duration based on jurisdiction) of exclusive right in the making, selling, use, leasing or otherwise of their novel technological inventions. Artificial intelligence, robotic inventions, new material, or blockchain platforms may be patentable, the patent protecting the technological know-how used to create these inventions.

In 2019, the World Intellectual Property Organization (WIPO) reported that AI was the most prolific emerging technology in terms of number of patent applications and granted patents, the Internet of things was estimated to be the largest in terms of market size. It was followed, again in market size, by big data technologies, robotics, AI, 3D printing and the fifth generation of mobile services (5G). Since AI emerged in the 1950s, 340,000 AI-related patent applications were filed by innovators and 1.6 million scientific papers have been published by researchers, with the majority of all AI-related patent filings published since 2013. Companies represent 26 out of the top 30 AI patent applicants, with universities or public research organizations accounting for the remaining four.

=== DARPA ===
DARPA (Defense Advanced Research Projects Agency) is an agency of the U.S. Department of Defense responsible for the development of emerging technologies for use by the military.

DARPA was created in 1958 as the Advanced Research Projects Agency (ARPA) by President Dwight D. Eisenhower. Its purpose was to formulate and execute research and development projects to expand the frontiers of technology and science, with the aim to reach beyond immediate military requirements.

Projects funded by DARPA have provided significant technologies that have influenced many non-military fields, such as the Internet and Global Positioning System technology.

=== Technology competitions and awards ===
There are awards that provide incentive to push the limits of technology (generally synonymous with emerging technologies). Note that while some of these awards reward achievement after-the-fact via analysis of the merits of technological breakthroughs, others provide incentive via competitions for awards offered for goals yet to be achieved.

The Orteig Prize was a $25,000 award offered in 1919 by French hotelier Raymond Orteig for the first nonstop flight between New York City and Paris. In 1927, underdog Charles Lindbergh won the prize in a modified single-engine Ryan aircraft called the Spirit of St. Louis. In total, nine teams spent $400,000 in pursuit of the Orteig Prize.

The XPRIZE series of awards, public competitions designed and managed by the non-profit organization called the X Prize Foundation, are intended to encourage technological development that could benefit mankind. The most high-profile XPRIZE to date was the $10,000,000 Ansari XPRIZE relating to spacecraft development, which was awarded in 2004 for the development of SpaceShipOne.

The Turing Award is an annual prize given by the Association for Computing Machinery (ACM) to "an individual selected for contributions of a technical nature made to the computing community." It is stipulated that the contributions should be of lasting and major technical importance to the computer field. The Turing Award is generally recognized as the highest distinction in computer science, and in 2014 grew to $1,000,000.

The Millennium Technology Prize is awarded once every two years by Technology Academy Finland, an independent fund established by Finnish industry and the Finnish state in partnership. The first recipient was Tim Berners-Lee, inventor of the World Wide Web.

In 2003, David Gobel seed-funded the Methuselah Mouse Prize (Mprize) to encourage the development of new life extension therapies in mice, which are genetically similar to humans. So far, three Mouse Prizes have been awarded: one for breaking longevity records to Dr. Andrzej Bartke of Southern Illinois University; one for late-onset rejuvenation strategies to Dr. Stephen Spindler of the University of California; and one to Dr. Z. Dave Sharp for his work with the pharmaceutical rapamycin.

== Role of science fiction ==
Science fiction has often affected innovation and new technology by presenting creative, intriguing possibilities for technological advancement. For example, many rocketry pioneers were inspired by science fiction. The documentary How William Shatner Changed the World describes a number of examples of imagined technologies that became real.

== Bleeding edge ==
The term bleeding edge has been used to refer to some new technologies, formed as an allusion to the similar terms "leading edge" and "cutting edge". It tends to imply even greater advancement, albeit at an increased risk because of the unreliability of the software or hardware. The first documented example of this term being used dates to early 1983, when an unnamed banking executive was quoted to have used it in reference to Storage Technology Corporation.

== See also ==
- List of emerging technologies
- Bioconservatism
- Bioethics
- Biopolitics
- Current research in evolutionary biology
- Foresight (futures studies)
- Futures studies
- Future of Humanity Institute
- Institute for Ethics and Emerging Technologies
- Institute on Biotechnology and the Human Future
- Technological change
  - Differential technological development
  - Accelerating change
    - Moore's law
  - Innovation
  - Technological revolution
- Technological innovation system
- Technological utopianism
- Techno-progressivism
- Transhumanism
  - Technological singularity
- Category:Upcoming software
- Wearable computers
