= Societal impact of nanotechnology =

The societal impact of nanotechnology are the potential benefits and challenges that the introduction of novel nanotechnological devices and materials may hold for society and human interaction. The term is sometimes expanded to also include nanotechnology's health and environmental impact, but this article will only consider the social and political impact of nanotechnology.

As nanotechnology is an emerging field and most of its applications are still speculative, there is much debate about what positive and negative effects that nanotechnology might have.

== Overview ==
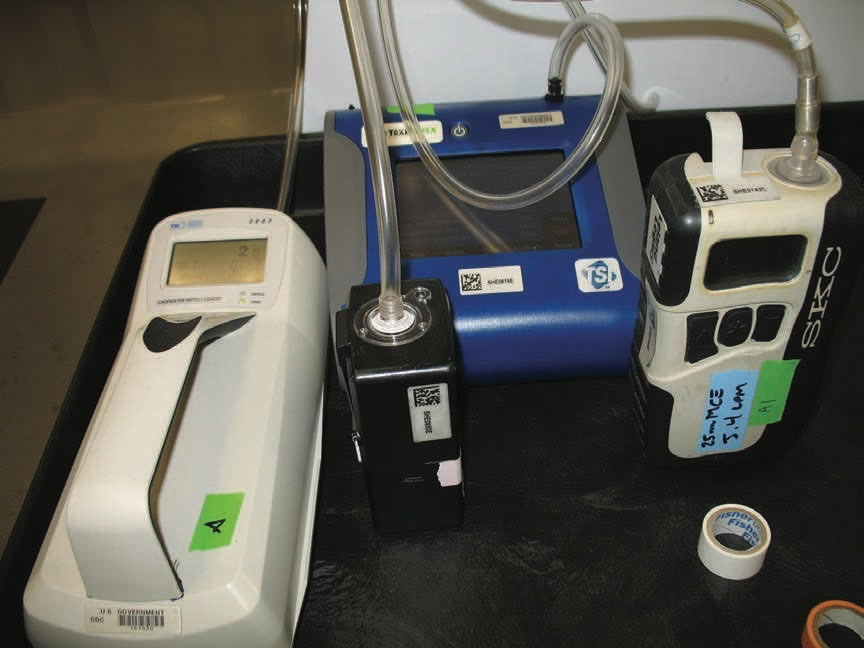
Airborne nanomaterials detection equipment

Beyond the toxicity risks to human health and the environment which are associated with first-generation nanomaterials, nanotechnology has broader societal implications and poses broader social challenges. Social scientists have suggested that nanotechnology's social issues should be understood and assessed not simply as "downstream" risks or impacts. Rather, the challenges should be factored into "upstream" research and decision making in order to ensure technology development that meets social objectives

Many social scientists and organizations in civil society suggest that technology assessment and governance should also involve public participation.

Though the innovative part of nano-technology may excite people a lot of other worries about the societal and natural impact the advancement of nano-technology will bring. Studies have shown numerous positive results of applying nano-technology but public opinion is vital to its success at transforming society. A number of different socio and political factors will be crucial to deciding the destiny of nano-technology.

Some observers suggest that nanotechnology will build incrementally, as did the 18–19th century Industrial Revolution, until it gathers pace to drive a nanotechnological revolution that will radically reshape our economies, our labor markets, international trade, international relations, social structures, civil liberties, our relationship with the natural world and even what we understand to be human. Others suggest that it may be more accurate to describe change driven by nanotechnology as a “technological tsunami”. Just like a tsunami, analysts warn that rapid nanotechnology-driven change will necessarily have profound disruptive impacts. As the APEC Center for Technology Foresight observes:

If nanotechnology is going to revolutionize manufacturing, health care, energy supply, communications and probably defense, then it will transform labour and the workplace, the medical system, the transportation and power infrastructures and the military. None of these latter will be changed without significant social disruption.

Those concerned with the negative impact of nanotechnology suggest that it will simply exacerbate problems stemming from existing socio-economic inequity and unequal distributions of power, creating greater inequities between rich and poor through an inevitable nano-divide (the gap between those who control the new nanotechnologies and those whose products, services or labour are displaced by them). Analysts suggest the possibility that nanotechnology has the potential to destabilize international relations through a nano arms race and the increased potential for bioweaponry; thus, providing the tools for ubiquitous surveillance with significant implications for civil liberties. Also, many critics believe it might break down the barriers between life and non-life through nanobiotechnology, redefining even what it means to be human.

Nanotechnology has the potential to benefits all forms of work from daily life to medicine and biology. Despite these benefits, there are also health risks when it comes to human exposure to the nano material. Studies have shown that dangerous nano-particles can build up in the body after prolonged exposure. This is caused by a very complicated interaction between nano-particles and parts of the body's systems.

Nanoethicists posit that such a transformative technology could exacerbate the divisions of rich and poor – the so-called “nano divide.” However nanotechnology makes the production of technology, e.g. computers, cellular phones, health technology etcetera, cheaper and therefore accessible to the poor.

In fact, many of the most enthusiastic proponents of nanotechnology, such as transhumanists, see the nascent science as a mechanism to changing human nature itself – going beyond curing disease and enhancing human characteristics. Discussions on nanoethics have been hosted by the federal government, especially in the context of “converging technologies” – a catch-phrase used to refer to nano, biotech, information technology, and cognitive science.

== Possible military applications ==
Possible military applications of nanotechnology have been suggested in the fields of soldier enhancement () and chemical weapons amongst others. However, more socially disruptive weapon systems are to be expected from molecular manufacturing, a potential future form of nanotechnology that would make it possible to build complex structures at atomic precision. Molecular manufacturing requires significant advances in nanotechnology, but its supporters posit that once achieved it could produce highly advanced products at low costs and in large quantities in nanofactories weighing a kilogram or more. If nanofactories gain the ability to produce other nanofactories production may only be limited by relatively abundant factors such as input materials, energy and software.

Military applications for nanotechnology have the potential to revolutionize modern warfare. While many benefits may come from the applications of such technology there are risks involved. The emergence of nanotechnology will greatly change the fields of science medicine surveillance and energy. While human engineering and arms control may be better there may also be strict regulations on all forms of nanotech, especially autonomies, to prevent unfortunate incidents. Because of its constant fast growth countries would need to work together to solve the problem of hazard nano materials and to prevent an arms race as a result of social problems and poor communication.

Molecular manufacturing may be used to produce many products in a cost effective manner, including highly advanced & durable weapons. Being equipped with compact computers and motors, these have a large range of capabilities.

According to Chris Phoenix and Mike Treder from the Center for Responsible Nanotechnology as well as Anders Sandberg from the Future of Humanity Institute the military uses of molecular manufacturing are the applications of nanotechnology that pose the most significant global catastrophic risk. Several nanotechnology researchers state that the bulk of risk from nanotechnology comes from the potential to lead to war, arms races and destructive global government. Several reasons have been suggested why the availability of nanotech weaponry may with significant likelihood lead to unstable arms races (compared to e.g. nuclear arms races): (1) A large number of players may be tempted to enter the race since the threshold for doing so is low; (2) the ability to make weapons with molecular manufacturing might be cheap and easy to hide; (3) therefore lack of insight into the other parties' capabilities can tempt players to arm out of caution or to launch preemptive strikes; (4) molecular manufacturing may reduce dependency on international trade, a potential peace-promoting factor; (5) wars of aggression may pose a smaller economic threat to the aggressor since manufacturing is cheap and humans may not be needed on the battlefield.

Self-regulation by all state and non-state actors has been called hard to achieve, so measures to mitigate war-related risks have mainly been proposed in the area of international cooperation. International infrastructure may be expanded giving more sovereignty to the international level. This could help coordinate efforts for arms control. Some have put forth that international institutions dedicated specifically to nanotechnology (perhaps analogously to the International Atomic Energy Agency IAEA) or general arms control may also be designed. One may also jointly make differential technological progress on defensive technologies. The Center for Responsible Nanotechnology also suggest some technical restrictions. Improved transparency regarding technological capabilities may be another important facilitator for arms-control.

== Intellectual property issues ==
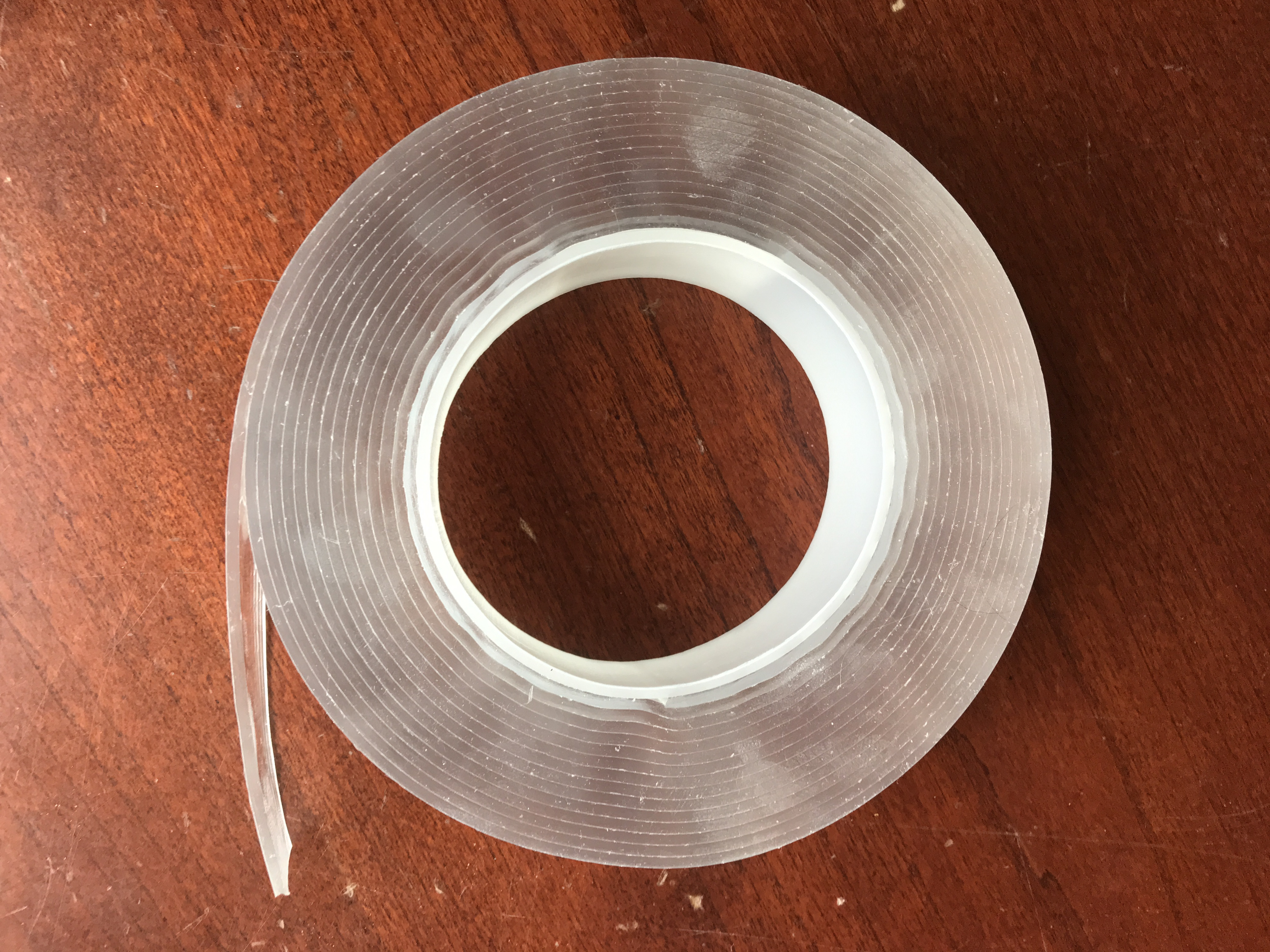
Carbon nanotube adhesive tape

On the structural level, critics of nanotechnology point to a new world of ownership and corporate control opened up by nanotechnology. The claim is that, just as biotechnology's ability to manipulate genes went hand in hand with the patenting of life, so too nanotechnology's ability to manipulate molecules has led to the patenting of matter. The last few years has seen a gold rush to claim patents at the nanoscale. Academics have warned that the resultant patent thicket is harming progress in the technology and have argued in the top journal Nature that there should be a moratorium on patents on "building block" nanotechnologies. Over 800 nano-related patents were granted in 2003, and the numbers are increasing year to year. Corporations are already taking out broad-ranging patents on nanoscale discoveries and inventions. For example, two corporations, NEC and IBM, hold the basic patents on carbon nanotubes, one of the current cornerstones of nanotechnology. Carbon nanotubes have a wide range of uses, and look set to become crucial to several industries from electronics and computers, to strengthened materials to drug delivery and diagnostics. Carbon nanotubes are poised to become a major traded commodity with the potential to replace major conventional raw materials. However, as their use expands, anyone seeking to (legally) manufacture or sell carbon nanotubes, no matter what the application, must first buy a license from NEC or IBM.

The United States' essential facilities doctrine may be of importance as well as other anti-trust laws.

== Potential benefits and risks for developing countries ==
Nanotechnologies may provide new solutions for the millions of people in developing countries who lack access to basic services, such as safe water, reliable energy, health care, and education. The United Nations has set Millennium Development Goals for meeting these needs. The 2004 UN Task Force on Science, Technology and Innovation noted that some of the advantages of nanotechnology include production using little labor, land, or maintenance, high productivity, low cost, and modest requirements for materials and energy.

Many developing countries, for example Costa Rica, Chile, Bangladesh, Thailand, and Malaysia, are investing considerable resources in research and development of nanotechnologies. Emerging economies such as Brazil, China, India and South Africa are spending millions of US dollars annually on R&D, and are rapidly increasing their scientific output as demonstrated by their increasing numbers of publications in peer-reviewed scientific publications.

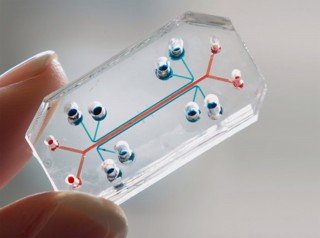
Lung on a chip

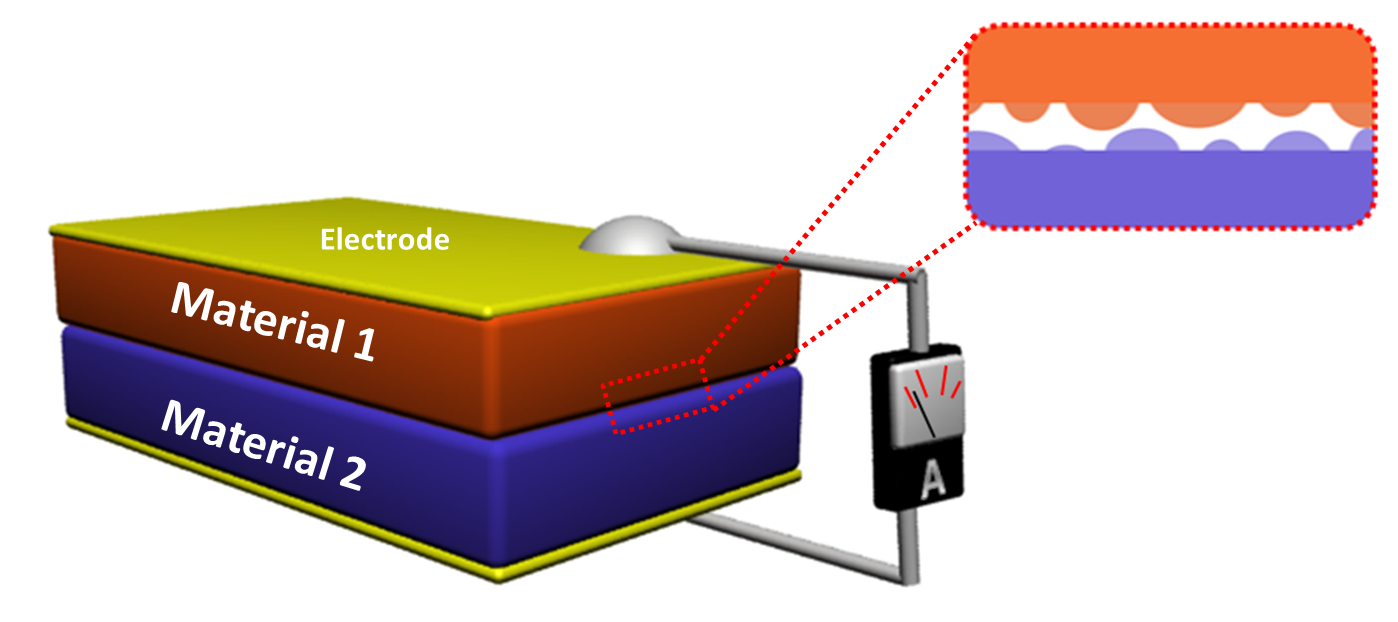
Simple triboelectric nanogenerator

Potential opportunities of nanotechnologies to help address critical international development priorities include improved water purification systems, energy systems, medicine and pharmaceuticals, food production and nutrition, and information and communications technologies. Nanotechnologies are already incorporated in products that are on the market. Other nanotechnologies are still in the research phase, while others are concepts that are years or decades away from development.

Applying nanotechnologies in developing countries raises similar questions about the environmental, health, and societal risks described in the previous section. Additional challenges have been raised regarding the linkages between nanotechnology and development.

Protection of the environment, human health and worker safety in developing countries often suffers from a combination of factors that can include but are not limited to lack of robust environmental, human health, and worker safety regulations; poorly or unenforced regulation which is linked to a lack of physical (e.g., equipment) and human capacity (i.e., properly trained regulatory staff). Often, these nations require assistance, particularly financial assistance, to develop the scientific and institutional capacity to adequately assess and manage risks, including the necessary infrastructure such as laboratories and technology for detection.

Companies, and to a lesser extent governments and universities, are receiving patents on nanotechnology. The rapid increase in patenting of nanotechnology is illustrated by the fact that in the US, there were 500 nanotechnology patent applications in 1998 and 1,300 in 2000. Some patents are very broadly defined, which has raised concern among some groups that the rush to patent could slow innovation and drive up costs of products, thus reducing the potential for innovations that could benefit low income populations in developing countries.

There is a clear link between commodities and poverty. Many least developed countries are dependent on a few commodities for employment, government revenue, and export earnings. Many applications of nanotechnology are being developed that could impact global demand for specific commodities. For instance, certain nanoscale materials could enhance the strength and durability of rubber, which might eventually lead to a decrease in demand for natural rubber. Other nanotechnology applications may result in increases in demand for certain commodities. For example, demand for titanium may increase as a result of new uses for nanoscale titanium oxides, such as titanium dioxide nanotubes that can be used to produce and store hydrogen for use as fuel. Various organizations have called for international dialogue on mechanisms that will allow developing countries to anticipate and proactively adjust to these changes.

In 2003, Meridian Institute began the Global Dialogue on Nanotechnology and the Poor: Opportunities and Risks (GDNP) to raise awareness of the opportunities and risks of nanotechnology for developing countries, close the gaps within and between sectors of society to catalyze actions that address specific opportunities and risks of nanotechnology for developing countries, and identify ways that science and technology can play an appropriate role in the development process. The GDNP has released several publicly accessible papers on nanotechnology and development, including "Nanotechnology and the Poor: Opportunities and Risks - Closing the Gaps Within and Between Sectors of Society"; "Nanotechnology, Water, and Development"; and "Overview and Comparison of Conventional and Nano-Based Water Treatment Technologies".

=== Social justice and civil liberties ===
Concerns are frequently raised that the claimed benefits of nanotechnology will not be evenly distributed, and that any benefits (including technical and/or economic) associated with nanotechnology will only reach affluent nations. The majority of nanotechnology research and development - and patents for nanomaterials and products - is concentrated in developed countries (including the United States, Japan, Germany, Canada and France). In addition, most patents related to nanotechnology are concentrated amongst few multinational corporations, including IBM, Micron Technologies, Advanced Micro Devices and Intel. This has led to fears that it will be unlikely that developing countries will have access to the infrastructure, funding and human resources required to support nanotechnology research and development, and that this is likely to exacerbate such inequalities.

Producers in developing countries could also be disadvantaged by the replacement of natural products (including rubber, cotton, coffee and tea) by developments in nanotechnology. These natural products are important export crops for developing countries, and many farmers' livelihoods depend on them. It has been argued that their substitution with industrial nano-products could negatively impact the economies of developing countries, that have traditionally relied on these export crops.

It is proposed that nanotechnology can only be effective in alleviating poverty and aid development "when adapted to social, cultural and local institutional contexts, and chosen and designed with the active participation by citizens right from the commencement point" (Invernizzi et al. 2008, p. 132).

== Effects on laborers ==
Ray Kurzweil has speculated in The Singularity is Near that people who work in unskilled labor jobs for a livelihood may become the first human workers to be displaced by the constant use of nanotechnology in the workplace, noting that layoffs often affect the jobs based around the lowest technology level before attacking jobs with the highest technology level possible. It has been noted that every major economic era has stimulated a global revolution both in the kinds of jobs that are available to people and the kind of training they need to achieve these jobs, and there is concern that the world's educational systems have lagged behind in preparing students for the "Nanotech Age".

It has also been speculated that nanotechnology may give rise to nanofactories which may have superior capabilities to conventional factories due to their small carbon and physical footprint on the global and regional environment. The miniaturization and transformation of the multi-acre conventional factory into the nanofactory may not interfere with their ability to deliver a high quality product; the product may be of even greater quality due to the lack of human errors in the production stages. Nanofactory systems may use precise atomic positioning and contribute to making superior quality products that the "bulk chemistry" method used in 20th century and early 21st currently cannot produce. These advances might shift the computerized workforce in an even more complex direction, requiring skills in genetics, nanotechnology, and robotics.

== Ethical ramifications of nanotechnology ==
Discussing the ethics of nanotechnology is difficult because its risks have not been verified or quantified to any great extent. Ethical debate is nonetheless necessary given how rapidly the technology is developing, with those in this field compelled to understand the potential risks and benefits for society as a whole, and not only for the scientific community. Nano-ethics emerged largely in response to proposals to use nanotechnology on humans and the environment in order to enhance or alter them. Scientists working in the field tend to be optimistic about its progress while remaining concerned about its risks to society, yet most people entering nanotechnology industries have little or no understanding of the ethics involved.

The advancement of science helped focus research into nanotechnology, soon the price of nano based material grew exponentially and funding was being given to its research. Though claims about its harmful affects also increased as did the concern of its effect on society. Laws were then made to monitor nano technology and make sure ethical, environmental and societal concerns were ingrained. Research programs and funding were encouraged internationally.

== Science and technology studies scholarship on nanotechnology ==
Science and technology studies research has played a significant role in examining how nanotechnology is developed, regulated, and received by society. Science and technology studies scholars have analyzed the ways in which expectations and promises about nanotechnology influence funding priorities, innovation trajectories, and public discourse. This body of work has also explored issues of risk perception, governance, and public engagement, highlighting the importance of including diverse perspectives in decision-making about emerging technologies. Notable studies have investigated how institutional practices, regulatory frameworks, and cultural contexts shape the societal outcomes of nanotechnology research and development.

=== Towards responsible and ethical nanotechnology development ===
Science and technology studies researchers have contributed to efforts aimed at making nanotechnology development more responsible and socially responsive. Drawing on interdisciplinary approaches, this scholarship has examined how societal values, ethical considerations, and public concerns can be integrated into research and innovation processes. Methods such as real-time technology assessment and midstream modulation have been developed to enable reflection and dialogue among scientists, policymakers, and stakeholders during the early stages of technological development. These practices seek to anticipate potential impacts, address uncertainties, and align nanotechnology with broader societal goals. STS studies have also highlighted the importance of inclusive public engagement and deliberation as a means to foster trust and legitimacy in the governance of emerging nanotechnologies.
