= Institute on Biotechnology and the Human Future =

The Institute on Biotechnology and the Human Future (IBHF) is an affiliate of the Illinois Institute of Technology (IIT) and is housed at IIT's Chicago-Kent College of Law. The IBHF was founded in 2004 by Lori Andrews, J.D., and Nigel M. de S. Cameron, Ph.D., to discuss and analyze the ethical, legal, and social implications of biotechnologies.

== Purpose ==
The Institute on Biotechnology and the Human Future offers assessments of the scientific benefits and risks of new developments in biotechnology in light of their cultural and ethical significance. IBHF couples continuing academic and policy research with the ability to provide analysis to industry and policymakers.

== History ==
The Institute on Biotechnology and the Human Future was established early in 2004 at Chicago-Kent College of Law, Illinois Institute of Technology. Working at the intersection of a variety of disciplines, the IBHF has become as a leader in the study of biotechnology and its implications for the human future. The IBHF has regularly been called to Washington D.C. to present information to the United States Congress on matters related to biotechnology and public policy. In addition, the IBHF host numerous forums, symposia, and other conferences around the world aimed at furthering public discourse and understanding of important issues in biotechnology. Lori B. Andrews, J.D., distinguished professor of law at Chicago-Kent and a leading commentator on the legal and social issues raised by biotechnology, co-founded the institute, and continues to serve as an advisor. Nigel M. de S. Cameron, Ph.D., a bioethics scholar whose special focus is the relations of human values and public policy, joined the law school as university research professor of bioethics with responsibility for the development of the institute.

== Program areas ==
The IBHF conducts research on existing and emerging biotechnologies and their effect on law, intellectual property regimes, public health, medicine, genetics, public policy and the environment. IBHF focuses its efforts on six core areas:

Genetic discrimination While the rapid advances in genetic technologies offer great promise for the diagnosis and treatment of inheritable diseases, they also raise serious concerns about the potential for the use of this genetic information to discriminate against certain individuals. The IBHF analyzes state and federal law, public opinion, and industry information to make policy recommendations.

Germline intervention Germline Genetic Intervention makes possible changes that will spread to every subsequent generation; this form of genetic engineering can also be called inheritable genetic modification and has the potential to change the human species along eugenic lines. The IBHF analyzes scientific research related to germline intervention and its implications to law and bioethics.

Gene patents Patents for human genetic material grant exclusivity over naturally occurring sequences of human genes and their effect on research and diagnosis. The IBHF reviews and analyzes the effects of gene patents on research, healthcare, business, and individual rights.

Nanotechnology The IBHF reviews the development of nanotechnology policy in the United States and Europe, with special focus on the emerging nanotechnology ethical, legal, and social issues (NELSI).

Human cloning “Somatic cell nuclear transfer” technology can be used to bring about the birth of replica offspring, and to create embryos for experimentation. The IBHF reviews and analyzes scientific information and policy debates to make recommendations and presentations around the world, including the United Nations and in U.S. federal and state bodies.

Reproductive technology The IBHF analyzes developments in reproductive technology, and focuses research on its related ethical, legal, social, and political considerations.

== Themes ==
IBHF themes represent diverse perspectives from which to analyze issues in biotechnology. These themes are designed to encourage academics, scientists, policy makers, and the general public to discuss complicated biotech issues in relation to their everyday lives. IBHF themes include: Arts; Bio 101; Business; Eugenics; Human Enhancement; International

== Publications, conferences, and events ==
The IBHF facilitates numerous conferences, symposia, and other events aimed at building a broad public discussion for issues in biotechnology, law, and society. Past events include:

- Capitol Hill Briefing and national Press Club Symposium, entitled Toward a Consensus on Cloning? U.S. Policy and the Global Debate
- The Face of the Future: Technosapians? Phase II, a conference on emerging technologies and human nature in Washington, D.C., co-sponsored with the Center for Bioethics and Culture (CBC, and the International Center for Technology Assessment (ICTA)
- Capitol Hill Briefing on Gene Patents and Embryo Patents: Policies and Impacts
- Proposition 71: A Roundtable on Politics, Ethics, and Science, co-sponsored with the CBC and ICTA
- Chicago Nano Forum – Hype or Hope: Exploring Nano, Risk and Ethics
- Illinois Institute of Technology Nano Colloquium
- IBHF staff, fellows and scholars generate publications to advance the scholarly discourse in the fields of biotechnology, law, and society. IBHF publications include:
- The Human Future, e-newsletter
- Nano & Society, e-newsletter
- Nanologues, quarterly publication
