= Applications of nanotechnology =

Uses for technology on very small scales

The applications of nanotechnology include industrial, medicinal, and energy uses. Nanotechnology's use of smaller-sized materials allows for adjustment of molecules and substances at the nanoscale level, which can further enhance the mechanical properties of materials or grant access to less physically accessible areas of the body. Because nanoparticles and nanodevices are highly versatile through modification of their physiochemical properties, they have found uses in nanoscale electronics, cancer treatments, vaccines, hydrogen fuel cells, and nanographene batteries.

== Industrial applications ==
=== Potential applications of carbon nanotubes ===
Nanotubes are being researched for their potential use in cancer treatment. They have been shown to be effective tumor killers in those with kidney or breast cancer. Multi-walled nanotubes are injected into a tumor and treated with near-infrared laser irradiation that generates near-infrared radiation for around half a minute. These nanotubes vibrate in response to the laser, and heat is generated. When the tumor has been heated enough, the tumor cells begin to die. Processes like this one have been able to shrink kidney tumors by up to four-fifths.

Ultrablack materials, made up of "forests" of carbon nanotubes, are important in space, where there is more light than is convenient to work with. Ultrablack material can be applied to camera and telescope systems to decrease the amount of light and allow for more detailed images to be captured.

Nanotubes show promise in treating cardiovascular disease. They could play an important role in blood vessel cleanup. Theoretically, nanotubes with SHP1i molecules attached to them would signal macrophages to clean up plaque in blood vessels without destroying any healthy tissue. Researchers have tested this type of modified nanotube in mice with high amounts of plaque buildup; the mice that received the nanotube treatment showed statistically significant reductions in plaque buildup compared to the mice in the placebo group. Further research is needed for this treatment to be given to humans.

Nanotubes may be used in body armor for future soldiers. This type of armor would be very strong and highly effective at shielding soldiers' bodies from projectiles and electromagnetic radiation. Nanotubes may also be used in the armor could play a role in keeping an eye on soldiers' conditions.

=== Construction ===
Nanotechnology's ability to observe and control the material world at a nanoscopic level can offer great potential for construction development. Nanotechnology can help improve the strength and durability of construction materials, including cement, steel, wood, and glass.

By applying nanotechnology, materials can gain new properties. The discovery of a crystal nanostructure of amorphous C-S-H gel and the application of photocatalyst and coating result in a new generation of materials with properties like water resistance, self-cleaning property, wear resistance, and corrosion protection. Among the new nanoengineered polymers, there are useful superplasticizers for concrete and high-strength fibers with exceptional energy absorbing capacity.

Experts believe that nanotechnology remains in its exploration stage and has potential in improving conventional materials such as steel. Understanding the composite nanostructures of such materials and exploring nanomaterials' different applications may lead to the development of new materials with expanded properties, such as electrical conductivity as well as temperature-, moisture- and stress-sensing abilities.

Due to the complexity of the equipment, nanomaterials have high cost compared to conventional materials, meaning they are not likely to feature high-volume building materials. In special cases, nanotechnology can help reduce costs for complicated problems. But in most cases, the traditional method for construction remains more cost-efficient. With the improvement of manufacturing technologies, the costs of applying nanotechnology into construction have been decreasing over time and are expected to decrease more.

=== Nanoelectronics ===
Nanoelectronics refers to the application of nanotechnology on electronic components. Nanoelectronics aims to improve the performance of electronic devices on displays and power consumption while shrinking them. Therefore, nanoelectronics can help reach the goal set up in Moore's law, which predicts the continued trend of scaling down in the size of integrated circuits.

Nanoelectronics is a multidisciplinary area composed of quantum physics, device analysis, system integration, and circuit analysis. Since de Broglie wavelength in the semiconductors may be on the order of 100 nm, the quantum effect at this length scale becomes essential. The different device physics and novel quantum effects of electrons can lead to exciting applications.

== Health applications ==
=== Nanobiotechnology ===
The terms "nanobiotechnology" and "bionanotechnology" refer to the combination of ideas, techniques, and sciences of biology and nanotechnology. More specifically, nanobiotechnology refers to the application of nanoscale objects for biotechnology, while bionanotechnology refers to the use of biological components in nanotechnology.

The most prominent intersection of nanotechnology and biology is in the field of nanomedicine, where the use of nanoparticles and nanodevices has many clinical applications in delivering therapeutic drugs, monitoring health conditions, and diagnosing diseases. Being that much of the biological processes in the human body occur at the cellular level, the small size of nanomaterials allows for them to be used as tools that can easily circulate within the body and directly interact with intercellular and even intracellular environments. In addition, nanomaterials can have physiochemical properties that differ from their bulk form due to their size, allowing for varying chemical reactivities and diffusion effects that can be studied and changed for diversified applications.

A common application of nanomedicine is in therapeutic drug delivery, where nanoparticles containing drugs for therapeutic treatment of disease are introduced into the body and act as vessels that deliver the drugs to the targeted area. The nanoparticle vessels, which can be made of organic or synthetic components, can further be functionalized by adjusting their size, shape, surface charge, and surface attachments (proteins, coatings, polymers, etc.). The opportunity for functionalizing nanoparticles in such ways is especially beneficial when targeting areas of the body that have certain physiochemical properties that prevent the intended drug from reaching the targeted area alone; for example, some nanoparticles are able to bypass the Blood Brain Barrier to deliver therapeutic drugs to the brain. Nanoparticles have recently been used in cancer therapy treatments and vaccines. Magnetic nanorobots have demonstrated capabilities to prevent and treat antimicrobial resistant bacteria. The application of nanomotor implants have been proposed to achieve thorough disinfection of the dentine.

In vivo imaging is also a key part in nanomedicine, as nanoparticles can be used as contrast agents for common imaging techniques such as computed tomography (CT), magnetic resonance imaging (MRI), and positron emission tomography (PET). The ability for nanoparticles to localize and circulate in specific cells, tissues, or organs through their design can provide high contrast that results in higher sensitivity imaging, and thus can be applicable in studying pharmacokinetics or visual disease diagnosis.

== Energy applications ==
The energy applications of nanotechnology relates to using the small size of nanoparticles to store energy more efficiently. This promotes the use of renewable energy through green nanotechnology by generating, storing, and using energy without emitting harmful greenhouse gases such as carbon dioxide.

=== Solar Cells ===
Nanoparticles used in solar cells are increasing the amount of energy absorbed from sunlight.

=== Hydrogen Fuel Cells ===
Nanotechnology is enabling the use of hydrogen energy at a much higher capacity. Hydrogen fuel cells, while they are not an energy source themselves, allow for storing energy from sunlight and other renewable sources in an environmentally-friendly fashion without any CO_{2} emissions. Some of the main drawbacks of traditional hydrogen fuel cells are that they are expensive and not durable enough for commercial uses. However, by using nanoparticles, both the durability and price over time improve significantly. Furthermore, conventional fuel cells are too large to be stored in volume, but researchers have discovered that nanoblades can store greater volumes of hydrogen that can then be saved inside carbon nanotubes for long-term storage.

=== Nanographene Batteries ===
Nanotechnology is giving rise to nanographene batteries that can store energy more efficiently and weigh less. Lithium-ion batteries have been the primary battery technology in electronics for the last decade, but the current limits in the technology make it difficult to densify batteries due to the potential dangers of heat and explosion. Graphene batteries being tested in experimental electric cars have promised capacities 4 times greater than current batteries with the cost being 77% lower. Additionally, graphene batteries provide stable life cycles of up to 250,000 cycles, which would allow electric vehicles and long-term products a reliable energy source for decades.
