= Green nanotechnology =

Environmentally-oriented nanotechnology

Green nanotechnology refers to the use of nanotechnology to enhance the environmental sustainability of processes producing negative externalities. It also refers to the use of the products of nanotechnology to enhance sustainability. It includes making green nano-products and using nano-products in support of sustainability.

The word GREEN in the name Green Nanotechnology has dual meaning. On one hand it describes the environment friendly technologies utilized to synthesize particles in nano scale; on the other hand it refers to the nanoparticles synthesis mediated by extracts of chlorophyllus plants. Green nanotechnology has been described as the development of clean technologies, "to minimize potential environmental and human health risks associated with the manufacture and use of nanotechnology products. It also encourages replacement of existing products with new nano-products that are more environmentally friendly throughout their lifecycle."

== Aim ==
Green nanotechnology has two goals: producing nanomaterials and products without harming the environment or human health, and producing nano-products that provide solutions to environmental problems. It uses existing principles of green chemistry and green engineering to make nanomaterials and nano-products without toxic ingredients, at low temperatures using less energy and renewable inputs wherever possible, and using lifecycle thinking in all design and engineering stages.

In addition to making nanomaterials and products with less impact to the environment, green nanotechnology also means using nanotechnology to make current manufacturing processes for non-nano materials and products more environmentally friendly. For example, nanoscale membranes can help separate desired chemical reaction products from waste materials from plants. Nanoscale catalysts can make chemical reactions more efficient and less wasteful. Sensors at the nanoscale can form a part of process control systems, working with nano-enabled information systems. Using alternative energy systems, made possible by nanotechnology, is another way to "green" manufacturing processes.

The second goal of green nanotechnology involves developing products that benefit the environment either directly or indirectly. Nanomaterials or products directly can clean hazardous waste sites, desalinate water, treat pollutants, or sense and monitor environmental pollutants. Indirectly, lightweight nanocomposites for automobiles and other means of transportation could save fuel and reduce materials used for production; nanotechnology-enabled fuel cells and light-emitting diodes (LEDs) could reduce pollution from energy generation and help conserve fossil fuels; self-cleaning nanoscale surface coatings could reduce or eliminate many cleaning chemicals used in regular maintenance routines; and enhanced battery life could lead to less material use and less waste. Green Nanotechnology takes a broad systems view of nanomaterials and products, ensuring that unforeseen consequences are minimized and that impacts are anticipated throughout the full life cycle.

== Current research ==
=== Solar cells ===
Research is underway to use nanomaterials for purposes including more efficient solar cells, practical fuel cells, and environmentally friendly batteries. The most advanced nanotechnology projects related to energy are: storage, conversion, manufacturing improvements by reducing materials and process rates, energy saving (by better thermal insulation for example), and enhanced renewable energy sources.

One major project that is being worked on is the development of nanotechnology in solar cells. Solar cells are more efficient as they get tinier and solar energy is a renewable resource. The price per watt of solar energy is lower than one dollar.

Research is ongoing to use nanowires and other nanostructured materials with the hope of to create cheaper and more efficient solar cells than are possible with conventional planar silicon solar cells. Another example is the use of fuel cells powered by hydrogen, potentially using a catalyst consisting of carbon supported noble metal particles with diameters of 1–5 nm. Materials with small nanosized pores may be suitable for hydrogen storage. Nanotechnology may also find applications in batteries, where the use of nanomaterials may enable batteries with higher energy content or supercapacitors with a higher rate of recharging.

Nanotechnology is already used to provide improved performance coatings for photovoltaic (PV) and solar thermal panels. Hydrophobic and self-cleaning properties combine to create more efficient solar panels, especially during inclement weather. PV covered with nanotechnology coatings are said to stay cleaner for longer to ensure maximum energy efficiency is maintained.

=== Nanoremediation and water treatment ===
Nanotechnology offers the potential of novel nanomaterials for the treatment of surface water, groundwater, wastewater, and other environmental materials contaminated by toxic metal ions, organic and inorganic solutes, and microorganisms. Due to their unique activity toward recalcitrant contaminants, many nanomaterials are under active research and development for use in the treatment of water and contaminated sites.

The present market of nanotech-based technologies applied in water treatment consists of reverse osmosis(RO), nanofiltration, ultrafiltration membranes. Indeed, among emerging products one can name nanofiber filters, carbon nanotubes and various nanoparticles.

Nanotechnology is expected to deal more efficiently with contaminants which convectional water treatment systems struggle to treat, including bacteria, viruses and heavy metals. This efficiency generally stems from the very high specific surface area of nanomaterials, which increases dissolution, reactivity and sorption of contaminants.

==== Environmental remediation ====
Nanoremediation is the use of nanoparticles for environmental remediation. Nanoremediation has been most widely used for groundwater treatment, with additional extensive research in wastewater treatment. Nanoremediation has also been tested for soil and sediment cleanup. Even more preliminary research is exploring the use of nanoparticles to remove toxic materials from gases.

Some nanoremediation methods, particularly the use of nano zerovalent iron for groundwater cleanup, have been deployed at full-scale cleanup sites. Nanoremediation is an emerging industry; by 2009, nanoremediation technologies had been documented in at least 44 cleanup sites around the world, predominantly in the United States. During nanoremediation, a nanoparticle agent must be brought into contact with the target contaminant under conditions that allow a detoxifying or immobilizing reaction. This process typically involves a pump-and-treat process or in situ application. Other methods remain in research phases.

Scientists have been researching the capabilities of buckminsterfullerene in controlling pollution, as it may be able to control certain chemical reactions. Buckminsterfullerene has been demonstrated as having the ability of inducing the protection of reactive oxygen species and causing lipid peroxidation. This material may allow for hydrogen fuel to be more accessible to consumers.

==== Water cleaning technology ====
In 2017 the RingwooditE Co Ltd was formed in order to explore Thermonuclear Trap Technology (TTT) for the purpose of cleaning all sources of water from pollution and toxic contents. This patented nanotechnology uses a high pressure and temperature chamber to separate isotopes that should by nature not be in drinking water to pure drinking water, as to the by the WHO´s established classification. This method has been developed by among others, by professor Vladimir Afanasiew, at the Moscow Nuclear Institution. This technology is targeted to clean Sea, river, lake and landfill waste waters. It even removes radioactive isotopes from the sea water, after Nuclear Power Stations catastrophes and cooling water plant towers. By this technology pharmaca rests are being removed as well as narcotics and tranquilizers. Bottom layers and sides at lake and rivers can be returned, after being cleaned. Machinery used for this purpose are much similar to those of deep sea mining. Removed waste items are being sorted by the process, and can be re used as raw material for other industrial production.

==== Water filtration ====
Nanofiltration is a relatively recent membrane filtration process used most often with low total dissolved solids water such as surface water and fresh groundwater, with the purpose of softening (polyvalent cation removal) and removal of disinfection by-product precursors such as natural organic matter and synthetic organic matter. Nanofiltration is also becoming more widely used in food processing applications such as dairy, for simultaneous concentration and partial (monovalent ion) demineralisation.

Nanofiltration is a membrane filtration based method that uses nanometer sized cylindrical through-pores that pass through the membrane at a 90°. Nanofiltration membranes have pore sizes from 1-10 Angstrom, smaller than that used in microfiltration and ultrafiltration, but just larger than that in reverse osmosis. Membranes used are predominantly created from polymer thin films. Materials that are commonly used include polyethylene terephthalate or metals such as aluminum. Pore dimensions are controlled by pH, temperature and time during development with pore densities ranging from 1 to 106 pores per cm^{2}. Membranes made from polyethylene terephthalate and other similar materials, are referred to as "track-etch" membranes, named after the way the pores on the membranes are made. "Tracking" involves bombarding the polymer thin film with high energy particles. This results in making tracks that are chemically developed into the membrane, or "etched" into the membrane, which are the pores. Membranes created from metal such as alumina membranes, are made by electrochemically growing a thin layer of aluminum oxide from aluminum in an acidic medium.

Some water-treatment devices incorporating nanotechnology are already on the market, with more in development. Low-cost nanostructured separation membranes methods have been shown to be effective in producing potable water in a recent study.

==== Nanotech to disinfect water ====
Nanotechnology provides an alternative solution to clean germs in water, a problem that has been getting worse due to the population explosion, growing need for clean water and the emergence of additional pollutants. One of the alternatives offered is antimicrobial nanotechnology stated that several nanomaterials showed strong antimicrobial properties through diverse mechanisms, such as photocatalytic production of reactive oxygen species that damage cell components and viruses. There is also the case of the synthetically-fabricated nanometallic particles that produce antimicrobial action called oligodynamic disinfection, which can inactivate microorganisms at low concentrations. Commercial purification systems based on titanium oxide photocatalysis also currently exist and studies show that this technology can achieve complete inactivation of fecal coliforms in 15 minutes once activated by sunlight.

There are four classes of nanomaterials that are employed for water treatment and these are dendrimers, zeolites, carbonaceous nanomaterials, and metals containing nanoparticles. The benefits of the reduction of the size of the metals (e.g. silver, copper, titanium, and cobalt) to the nanoscale such as contact efficiency, greater surface area, and better elution properties.

== Medicical values ==
The plants have been known to possess various phytochemicals (secondary metabolites) which help them to protect themselves, these phytoehemicals since time immemorial have been used by humans for their medicinal needs. The microbes are developing resistant again multiple synthetic drugs, thus leading to the emergence of MDR (Multi Drug Resistant) strains of microbes, which pose a challenge to the modern drug system. To overcome this challenge, the nanoparticles synthesized using extracts of plant and plant parts have emerged as a hope. Many workers have reported that the nanoparticles synthesized using plant extracts have shown to exhibit enhanced medicinal properties as compared to the extract(s) alone.

== Cleaning up oil spills ==
The U.S. Environmental Protection Agency (EPA) documents more than ten thousand oil spills per year. Conventionally, biological, dispersing, and gelling agents are deployed to remedy oil spills. Although, these methods have been used for decades, none of these techniques can retrieve the irreplaceable lost oil. However, nanowires can not only swiftly clean up oil spills but also recover as much oil as possible. These nanowires form a mesh that absorbs up to twenty times its weight in hydrophobic liquids while rejecting water with its water repelling coating. Since the potassium manganese oxide is very stable even at high temperatures, the oil can be boiled off the nanowires and both the oil and the nanowires can then be reused.

In 2005, Hurricane Katrina damaged or destroyed more than thirty oil platforms and nine refineries. The Interface Science Corporation successfully launched a new oil remediation and recovery application, which used the water repelling nanowires to clean up the oil spilled by the damaged oil platforms and refineries.

=== Removing plastics from oceans ===
One innovation of green nanotechnology that is currently under development are nanomachines modeled after a bacterium bioengineered to consume plastics, Ideonella sakaiensis. These nano-machines are able to decompose plastics dozens of times faster than the bioengineered bacteria not only because of their increased surface area but also because the energy released from decomposing the plastic is used to fuel the nano-machines.

=== Air pollution control ===
In addition to water treatment and environmental remediation, nanotechnology is currently improving air quality. Nanoparticles can be engineered to catalyze, or hasten, the reaction to transform environmentally pernicious gases into harmless ones. For example, many industrial factories that produce large amounts harmful gases employ a type of nanofiber catalyst made of magnesium oxide (Mg_{2}O) to purify dangerous organic substances in the smoke. Although chemical catalysts already exist in the gaseous vapors from cars, nanotechnology has a greater chance of reacting with the harmful substances in the vapors. This greater probability comes from the fact that nanotechnology can interact with more particles because of its greater surface area.

Nanotechnology has been used to remediate air pollution including car exhaust pollution, and potentially greenhouse gases due to its high surface area. Based on research done by the Environmental Science Pollution Research International, nanotechnology can specifically help to treat carbon-based nanoparticles, greenhouse gases, and volatile organic compounds. There is also work being done to develop antibacterial nanoparticles, metal oxide nanoparticles, and amendment agents for phytoremediation processes. Nanotechnology can also give the possibility of preventing air pollution in the first place due to its extremely small scale. Nanotechnology has been accepted as a tool for many industrial and domestic fields like gas monitoring systems, fire and toxic gas detectors, ventilation control, breath alcohol detectors and many more. Other sources state that nanotechnology has the potential to develop the pollutants sensing and detection methods that already exist. The ability to detect pollutants and sense unwanted materials will be heightened by the large surface area of nanomaterials and their high surface energy. The World Health Organization declared in 2014 that air contamination caused around 7 million deaths in 2012. This new technology could be an essential asset to this epidemic. The three ways that nanotechnology is being used to treat air pollution are nano-adsorptive materials, degradation by nanocatalysis, and filtration/separation by nanofilters. Nanoscale adsorbents being the main alleviator for many air pollution difficulties. Their structure permits a great interaction with organic compounds as well as increased selectivity and stability in maximum adsorption capacity. Other advantages include high electrical and thermal conductivities, high strength, high hardness. Target pollutants that can be targeted by nanomolecules are 〖NO〗_x, 〖CO〗_2, 〖NH〗_3, N_2, VOCs, Isopropyl vapor, 〖CH〗_3 OH gases, N_2 O, H_2 S. Carbon nanotubes specifically remove particles in many ways. One method is by passing them through the nanotubes where the molecules are oxidized; the molecules then are adsorbed on a nitrate species. Carbon nanotubes with amine groups provide numerous chemical sites for carbon dioxide adsorption at low temperature ranges of 20°-100° degrees Celsius. Van der Waals forces and π-π interactions also are used to pull molecules onto surface functional groups. Fullerene can be used to rid of carbon dioxide pollution due to its high adsorption capacity. Graphene nanotubes have functional groups that adsorb gases. There are plenty of nanocatalysts that can be used for air pollution reduction and air quality. Some of these materials include 〖TiO〗_2, Vanadium, Platinum, Palladium, Rhodium, and Silver. Catalytic industrial emission reduction, car exhaust reduction, and air purification are just some of the major thrusts that these nanomaterials are being utilized within. Certain applications are not widely spread, but other are more popular. Indoor air pollution is barely on the market yet, but it is being developed more efficiently due to complications with health effects. Car exhaust emission reduction is widely used in diesel fueled automobiles currently being one of the more popular applications. Industrial emission reduction is also widely used. It is n integral method specifically at coal fired power plants as well as refineries. These methods are analyzed and reviewed using SEM imaging to ensure its usefulness and accuracy.

Additionally, research is currently being conducted to find out if nanoparticles can be engineered to separate car exhaust from methane or carbon dioxide, which has been known to damage the Earth's ozone layer. In fact, John Zhu, a professor at the University of Queensland, is exploring the creation of a carbon nanotube(CNT) which can trap greenhouse gases hundreds of times more efficiently than current methods can.

== Nanotechnology for sensors ==
Perpetual exposure to heavy metal pollution and particulate matter will lead to health concerns such as lung cancer, heart conditions, and even motor neuron diseases. However, humanity's ability to shield themselves from these health problems can be improved by accurate and swift nanocontact-sensors able to detect pollutants at the atomic level. These nanocontact sensors do not require much energy to detect metal ions or radioactive elements. Additionally, they can be made in automatic mode so that they can be readably used at any given moment. Additionally, these nanocontact sensors are energy and cost effective since they are composed with conventional microelectronic manufacturing equipment using electrochemical techniques.

Some examples of nano-based monitoring include:

1. Functionalized nanoparticles able to form anionic oxidants bonding thereby allowing the detection of carcinogenic substances at very low concentrations.
2. Polymer nanospheres have been developed to measure organic contaminates in very low concentrations
3. "Peptide nanoelectrodes have been employed based on the concept of thermocouple. In a 'nano-distance separation gap, a peptide molecule is placed to form a molecular junction. When a specific metal ion is bound to the gap; the electrical current will result conductance in a unique value. Hence the metal ion will be easily detected."
4. Composite electrodes, a mixture of nanotubes and copper, have been created to detect substances such as organophosphorus pesticides, carbohydrates and other woods pathogenic substances in low concentrations.

== Concerns ==
Although green nanotechnology poses many advantages over traditional methods, there is still much debate about the concerns brought about by nanotechnology. For example, since the nanoparticles are small enough to be absorbed into skin and/or inhaled, countries are mandating that additional research revolving around the impact of nanotechnology on organisms be heavily studied. In fact, the field of eco-nanotoxicology was founded solely to study the effect of nanotechnology on earth and all of its organisms. At the moment, scientists are unsure of what will happen when nanoparticles seep into soil and water, but organizations, such as NanoImpactNet, have set out to study these effects.

== See also ==
- Bioremediation
- Clean technology
- Environmental microbiology
- Green chemistry
- Industrial microbiology
- LifeSaver bottle
- NBI Knowledgebase
- Tata Swach
