= Energy applications of nanotechnology =

As the world's energy demand continues to grow, the development of more efficient and sustainable technologies for generating and storing energy is becoming increasingly demanded. According to Dr. Wade Adams from Rice University, energy will be the most pressing problem facing humanity in the next 50 years and nanotechnology has potential to solve this issue. Nanotechnology, a field of science and engineering, has shown promise to have a significant impact on the energy industry. Nanotechnology is defined as any technology that involves "matter at the nanoscale, at dimensions between approximately 1 and 100 nanometers".

People in the fields of science and engineering have already begun developing ways of utilizing nanotechnology for the development of consumer products. Benefits already observed from the design of these products are an increased efficiency of lighting and heating, increased electrical storage capacity, and a decrease in the amount of pollution from the use of energy. Benefits such as these make the investment of capital in the research and development of nanotechnology a top priority.

== Commonly used nanomaterials in energy ==
An important sub-field of nanotechnology related to energy is nanofabrication, the process of designing and creating devices on the nanoscale. The ability to create devices smaller than 100 nanometers opens many doors for the development of new ways to capture, store, and transfer energy. Improvements in the precision of nanofabrication technologies are critical to solving many energy related problems that the world is currently facing.

=== Graphene-based materials ===
There is enormous interest in the use of graphene-based materials for energy storage. The research on the use of graphene for energy storage began very recently, but the growth rate of relative research is rapid.

Graphene recently emerged as a promising material for energy storage because of several properties, such as low weight, chemical inertness and low price. Graphene is an allotrope of carbon that exists as a two-dimensional sheet of carbon atoms organized in a hexagonal lattice. A family of graphene-related materials, called "graphenes" by the research community, consists of structural or chemical derivatives of graphene. The most important chemically derived graphene is graphene oxide (defined as single layer of graphite oxide, Graphite oxide can be obtained by reacting graphite with strong oxidizers, for example, a mixture of sulfuric acid, sodium nitrate, and potassium permanganate) which is usually prepared from graphite by oxidization to graphite oxide and consequent exfoliation. The properties of graphene depend greatly on the method of fabrication. For example, reduction of graphene oxide to graphene results in a graphene structure that is also one-atom thick but contains a high concentration of defects, such as nanoholes and Stone–Wales defects. Moreover, carbon materials, which have relatively high electrical conductivity and variable structures are extensively used in the modification of sulfur. Sulfur–carbon composites with diverse structures have been synthesized and exhibited remarkably improved electrochemical performance than pure sulfur, which is crucial for battery design. Graphene has great potential in the modification of a sulfur cathode for high performance Li-S batteries, which has been broadly investigated in recent years.

=== Silicon-based nano semiconductors ===
Silicon-based nano semiconductors have the most useful application in solar energy and it also has been extensively studied at many places, such as Kyoto University. They utilize silicon nanoparticles in order to absorb a greater range of wavelengths from the electromagnetic spectrum. This can be done by putting many identical and equally spaced silicon rods on the surface. Also, the height and length of spacing have to be optimized for reaching the best results. This arrangement of silicon particles allows solar energy to be reabsorbed by many different particles, exciting electrons and resulting in much of the energy being converted to heat. Then, the heat can be converted to electricity. Researchers from Kyoto University have shown that these nano-scale semiconductors can increase efficiency by at least 40%, compared to the regular solar cells.

=== Nanocellulose‐based materials ===
Cellulose is the most abundant natural polymer on earth. Currently, nanocellulose‐based mesoporous structures, flexible thin films, fibers, and networks are developed and used in photovoltaic (PV) devices, energy storage systems, mechanical energy harvesters, and catalysts components. Inclusion of nanocellulose in those energy‐related devices largely raises the portion of eco‐friendly materials and is very promising in addressing the relevant environmental concerns. Furthermore, cellulose manifests itself in the low cost and large‐scale promises.

== Nanostructures in energy ==
=== One-dimensional nanomaterials ===
One-dimensional nanostructures have shown promise to increase energy density, safety, and cycling-life of energy storage systems, an area in need of improvement for Li-ion batteries. These nanostructures are mainly used in battery electrodes because of their shorter bi-continuous ion and electron transport pathways, which results in higher battery performance.

Additionally, 1D nanostructures are capable of increasing charge storage by double layering, and can also be used on supercapacitors because of their fast pseudocapacitive surface redox processes. In the future, novel design and controllable synthesis of these materials will be developed much more in-depth. 1D nanomaterials are also environmentally friendly and cost-effective.

=== Two-dimensional nanomaterials ===
The most important feature of two dimensional nanomaterials is that their properties can be precisely controlled. This means that 2D nanomaterials can be easily modified and engineered on nanostructures. The interlayer space can also be manipulated for nonlayered materials, called 2D nanofluidic channels. 2D nanomaterials can also be engineered into porous structures in order to be used for energy storage and catalytic applications by applying facile charge and mass transport.

2D nanomaterials also have a few challenges. There are some side effects of modifying the properties of the materials, such as activity and structural stability, which can be compromised when they are engineered. For example, creating some defects can increase the number of active sites for higher catalytic performance, but side reactions may also happen, which could possibly damage the catalyst's structure. Another example is that interlayer expansion can lower the ion diffusion barrier in the catalytic reaction, but it can also potentially lower its structural stability. Because of this, there is a tradeoff between performance and stability. A second issue is consistency in design methods. For example, heterostructures are the main structures of the catalyst in interlayer space and energy storage devices, but these structures may lack the understanding of mechanism on the catalytic reaction or charge storage mechanisms. A deeper understanding of 2D nanomaterial design is required, because fundamental knowledge will lead to consistent and efficient methods of designing these structures. A third challenge is the practical application of these technologies. There is a huge difference between lab-scale and industry-scale applications of 2D nanomaterials due to their intrinsic instability during storage and processing. For example, porous 2D nanomaterial structures have low packing densities, which makes them difficult to pack into dense films. New processes are still being developed for the application of these materials on an industrial scale.

== Applications ==
=== Lithium-sulfur based high-performance batteries ===
The Li-ion battery is currently one of the most popular electrochemical energy storage systems and has been widely used in areas from portable electronics to electric vehicles. However, the gravimetric energy density of Li-ion batteries is limited and less than that of fossil fuels. The lithium sulfur (Li-S) battery, which has a much higher energy density than the Li-ion battery, has been attracting worldwide attention in recent years. A group of researches from the National Natural Science Foundation of China (Grant No. 21371176 and 21201173) and the Ningbo Science and Technology Innovation Team (Grant No. 2012B82001) have developed a nanostructure-based lithium-sulfur battery consisting of graphene/sulfur/carbon nano-composite multilayer structures. Nanomodification of sulfur can increase the electrical conductivity of the battery and improve electron transportation in the sulfur cathode. A graphene/sulfur/carbon nanocomposite with a multilayer structure (G/S/C), in which nanosized sulfur is layered on both sides of chemically reduced graphene sheets and covered with amorphous carbon layers, can be designed and successfully prepared. This structure achieves high conductivity, and surface protection of sulfur simultaneously, and thus gives rise to excellent charge/discharge performance. The G/S/C composite shows promising characteristics as a high performance cathode material for Li-S batteries.

=== Nanomaterials in solar cells ===
Engineered nanomaterials are key building blocks of the current generation solar cells. Today's best solar cells have layers of several different semiconductors stacked together to absorb light at different energies but still only manage to use approximately 40% of the Sun's energy. Commercially available solar cells have much lower efficiencies (15-20%). Nanostructuring has been used to improve the efficiencies of established photovoltaic (PV) technologies, for example, by improving current collection in amorphous silicon devices, plasmonic enhancement in dye-sensitized solar cells, and improved light trapping in crystalline silicon. Furthermore, nanotechnology could help increase the efficiency of light conversion by utilizing the flexible bandgaps of nanomaterials, or by controlling the directivity and photon escape probability of photovoltaic devices. Titanium dioxide (TiO_{2}) is one of the most widely investigated metal oxides for use in PV cells in the past few decades because of its low cost, environmental benignity, plentiful polymorphs, good stability, and excellent electronic and optical properties. However, their performances are greatly limited by the properties of the TiO_{2} materials themselves. One limitation is the wide band gap, making TiO_{2} only sensitive to ultraviolet (UV) light, which just occupies less than 5% of the solar spectrum. Recently, core–shell structured nanomaterials have attracted a great deal of attention as they represent the integration of individual components into a functional system, showing improved physical and chemical properties (e.g., stability, non-toxicity, dispersibility, multi-functionality), which are unavailable from the isolated components. For TiO_{2} nanomaterials, this core–shell structured design would provide a promising way to overcome their disadvantages, thus resulting in improved performances. Compared to sole TiO_{2} material, core–shell structured TiO_{2} composites show tunable optical and electrical properties, even new functions, which are originated from the unique core–shell structures.

=== Nanoparticle fuel additives ===
Nanomaterials can be used in a variety of ways to reduce energy consumption. Nanoparticle fuel additives can also be of great use in reducing carbon emissions and increasing the efficiency of combustion fuels. Cerium oxide nanoparticles have been shown to be very good at catalyzing the decomposition of unburnt hydrocarbons and other small particle emissions due to their high surface area to volume ratio, as well as lowering the pressure within the combustion chamber of engines to increase engine efficiency and curb NO_{x} emissions. Addition of carbon nanoparticles has also successfully increased burning rate and ignition delay in jet fuel. Iron nanoparticle additives to biodiesel and diesel fuels have also shown a decrease in fuel consumption and volumetric emissions of hydrocarbons by 3-6%, carbon monoxide by 6-12% and nitrogen oxides by 4-11% in one study.

==== Environmental and health impacts of fuel additives ====
While nanomaterials can increase energy efficiency of fuel in several ways, a drawback of their use lies in the effect of nanoparticles on the environment. With cerium oxide nanoparticle additives in fuel, trace amounts of these toxic particles can be emitted within the exhaust. Cerium oxide additives in diesel fuel have been shown to cause lung inflammation and increased bronchial alveolar lavage fluid in rats. This is concerning, especially in areas with high road traffic, where these particles are likely to accumulate and cause adverse health effects. Naturally occurring nanoparticles created by the incomplete combustion of diesel fuels are also large contributors to toxicity of diesel fumes. More research needs to be conducted to determine whether the addition of artificial nanoparticles to fuels decreases the net amount of toxic particle emissions due to combustion.

== Economic benefits ==
The relatively recent shift toward using nanotechnology with respect to the capture, transfer, and storage of energy has and will continue to have many positive economic impacts on society. The control of materials that nanotechnology offers to scientists and engineers of consumer products is one of the most important aspects of nanotechnology and allows for efficiency improvements of a variety of products. More efficient capture and storage of energy by use of nanotechnology may lead to decreased energy costs in the future, as preparation costs of nanomaterials becomes less expensive with more development.

A major issue with current energy generation is the generation of waste heat as a by-product of combustion. A common example of this is in an internal combustion engine. The internal combustion engine loses about 64% of the energy from gasoline as heat and an improvement of this alone could have a significant economic impact. However, improving the internal combustion engine in this respect has proven to be extremely difficult without sacrificing performance. Improving the efficiency of fuel cells through the use of nanotechnology appears to be more plausible by using molecularly tailored catalysts, polymer membranes, and improved fuel storage.

In order for a fuel cell to operate, particularly of the hydrogen variant, a noble-metal catalyst (usually platinum, which is very expensive) is needed to separate the electrons from the protons of the hydrogen atoms. However, catalysts of this type are extremely sensitive to carbon monoxide reactions. In order to combat this, alcohols or hydrocarbons compounds are used to lower the carbon monoxide concentration in the system. Using nanotechnology, catalysts can be designed through nanofabrication that limit incomplete combustion and thus decrease the amount of carbon monoxide, improving the efficiency of the process.

== See also ==
- Nanotechnology
- Energy
- Fuel cell
