= Impact of nanotechnology =

The impact of nanotechnology extends from its medical, ethical, mental, legal and environmental applications, to fields such as engineering, biology, chemistry, computing, materials science, and communications.

Major benefits of nanotechnology include improved manufacturing methods, water purification systems, energy systems, physical enhancement, nanomedicine, better food production methods, nutrition and large-scale infrastructure auto-fabrication. Nanotechnology's reduced size may allow for automation of tasks which were previously inaccessible due to physical restrictions, which in turn may reduce labor, land, or maintenance requirements placed on humans.

Potential risks include environmental, health, and safety issues; transitional effects such as displacement of traditional industries as the products of nanotechnology become dominant, which are of concern to privacy rights advocates. These may be particularly important if potential negative effects of nanoparticles are overlooked.

Whether nanotechnology merits special government regulation is a controversial issue. Regulatory bodies such as the United States Environmental Protection Agency and the Health and Consumer Protection Directorate of the European Commission have started dealing with the potential risks of nanoparticles. The organic food sector has been the first to act with the regulated exclusion of engineered nanoparticles from certified organic produce, firstly in Australia and the UK, and more recently in Canada, as well as for all food certified to Demeter International standards

== Overview ==
The presence of nanomaterials (materials that contain nanoparticles) is not in itself a threat. It is only certain aspects that can make them risky, in particular their mobility and their increased reactivity. Only if certain properties of certain nanoparticles were harmful to living beings or the environment would we be faced with a genuine hazard. In this case it can be called nanopollution.

In addressing the health and environmental impact of nanomaterials we need to differentiate between two types of nanostructures: (1) Nanocomposites, nanostructured surfaces and nanocomponents (electronic, optical, sensors etc.), where nanoscale particles are incorporated into a substance, material or device ("fixed" nano-particles); and (2) "free" nanoparticles, where at some stage in production or use individual nanoparticles of a substance are present. These free nanoparticles could be nanoscale species of elements, or simple compounds, but also complex compounds where for instance a nanoparticle of a particular element is coated with another substance ("coated" nanoparticle or "core-shell" nanoparticle).

There seems to be consensus that, although one should be aware of materials containing fixed nanoparticles, the immediate concern is with free nanoparticles.

Nanoparticles are very different from their everyday counterparts, so their adverse effects cannot be derived from the known toxicity of the macro-sized material. This poses significant issues for addressing the health and environmental impact of free nanoparticles.

To complicate things further, in talking about nanoparticles it is important that a powder or liquid containing nanoparticles almost never be monodisperse, but contain instead a range of particle sizes. This complicates the experimental analysis as larger nanoparticles might have different properties from smaller ones. Also, nanoparticles show a tendency to aggregate, and such aggregates often behave differently from individual nanoparticles.

== Health impact ==
A video on the health and safety implications of nanotechnology

The health impacts of nanotechnology are the possible effects that the use of nanotechnological materials and devices will have on human health. As nanotechnology is an emerging field, there is great debate regarding to what extent nanotechnology will benefit or pose risks for human health. Nanotechnology's health impacts can be split into two aspects: the potential for nanotechnological innovations to have medical applications to cure disease, and the potential health hazards posed by exposure to nanomaterials.

During the COVID-19 pandemic, researchers, engineers and medical professionals used a variety of nano science and nanotechnology approaches to explore the ways it could potentially help the medical, technical, and scientific communities to help fight the pandemic.

=== Medical applications ===
Nanomedicine is the medical application of nanotechnology. The approaches to nanomedicine range from the medical use of nanomaterials, to nanoelectronic biosensors, and even possible future applications of molecular nanotechnology. Nanomedicine seeks to deliver a valuable set of research tools and clinically helpful devices in the near future. The National Nanotechnology Initiative expects new commercial applications in the pharmaceutical industry that may include advanced drug delivery systems, new therapies, and in vivo imaging. Neuro-electronic interfaces and other nanoelectronics-based sensors are another active goal of research. Further down the line, the speculative field of molecular nanotechnology believes that cell repair machines could revolutionize medicine and the medical field.

Nanomedicine research is directly funded, with the US National Institutes of Health in 2005 funding a five-year plan to set up four nanomedicine centers. In April 2006, the journal Nature Materials estimated that 130 nanotech-based drugs and delivery systems were being developed worldwide. Nanomedicine is a large industry, with nanomedicine sales reaching $6.8 billion in 2004. With over 200 companies and 38 products worldwide, a minimum of $3.8 billion in nanotechnology R&D is being invested every year. As the nanomedicine industry continues to grow, it is expected to have a significant impact on the economy.

=== Health hazards ===
Nanotoxicology is the field which studies potential health risks of nanomaterials. The extremely small size of nanomaterials means that they are much more readily taken up by the human body than larger sized particles. How these nanoparticles behave inside the organism is one of the significant issues that needs to be resolved. The behavior of nanoparticles is a function of their size, shape and surface reactivity with the surrounding tissue. For example, they could cause overload on phagocytes, cells that ingest and destroy foreign matter, thereby triggering stress reactions that lead to inflammation and weaken the body's defense against other pathogens.

Apart from what happens if non-degradable or slowly degradable nanoparticles accumulate in organs, another concern is their potential interaction with biological processes inside the body: because of their large surface, nanoparticles on exposure to tissue and fluids will immediately adsorb onto their surface some of the macromolecules they encounter. This may, for instance, affect the regulatory mechanisms of enzymes and other proteins. The large number of variables influencing toxicity means that it is difficult to generalise about health risks associated with exposure to nanomaterials – each new nanomaterial must be assessed individually and all material properties must be taken into account. Health and environmental issues combine in the workplace of companies engaged in producing or using nanomaterials and in the laboratories engaged in nanoscience and nanotechnology research. It is safe to say that current workplace exposure standards for dusts cannot be applied directly to nanoparticle dusts.

The National Institute for Occupational Safety and Health has conducted initial research on how nanoparticles interact with the body's systems and how workers might be exposed to nano-sized particles in the manufacturing or industrial use of nanomaterials. NIOSH currently offers interim guidelines for working with nanomaterials consistent with the best scientific knowledge. At The National Personal Protective Technology Laboratory of NIOSH, studies investigating the filter penetration of nanoparticles on NIOSH-certified and EU marked respirators, as well as non-certified dust masks have been conducted. These studies found that the most penetrating particle size range was between 30 and 100 nanometers, and leak size was the largest factor in the number of nanoparticles found inside the respirators of the test dummies.

Other properties of nanomaterials that influence toxicity include: chemical composition, shape, surface structure, surface charge, aggregation and solubility, and the presence or absence of functional groups of other chemicals. The large number of variables influencing toxicity means that it is difficult to generalise about health risks associated with exposure to nanomaterials – each new nanomaterial must be assessed individually and all material properties must be taken into account.

Literature reviews have been showing that release of engineered nanoparticles and incurred personal exposure can happen during different work activities. The situation alerts regulatory bodies to necessitate prevention strategies and regulations at nanotechnology workplaces.

== Environmental impact ==
The environmental impact of nanotechnology is the possible effects that the use of nanotechnological materials and devices will have on the environment. As nanotechnology is an emerging field, there is debate regarding to what extent industrial and commercial use of nanomaterials will affect organisms and ecosystems.

Nanotechnology's environmental impact can be split into two aspects: the potential for nanotechnological innovations to help improve the environment, and the possibly novel type of pollution that nanotechnological materials might cause if released into the environment.

=== Environmental applications ===
Green nanotechnology refers to the use of nanotechnology to enhance the environmental sustainability of processes producing negative externalities. It also refers to the use of the products of nanotechnology to enhance sustainability. It includes making green nano-products and using nano-products in support of sustainability. Green nanotechnology has been described as the development of clean technologies, "to minimize potential environmental and human health risks associated with the manufacture and use of nanotechnology products, and to encourage replacement of existing products with new nano-products that are more environmentally friendly throughout their lifecycle."

Green nanotechnology has two goals: producing nanomaterials and products without harming the environment or human health, and producing nano-products that provide solutions to environmental problems. It uses existing principles of green chemistry and green engineering to make nanomaterials and nano-products without toxic ingredients, at low temperatures using less energy and renewable inputs wherever possible, and using lifecycle thinking in all design and engineering stages.

=== Pollution ===
Nanopollution is a generic name for all waste generated by nanodevices or during the nanomaterials manufacturing process. Nanowaste is mainly the group of particles that are released into the environment, or the particles that are thrown away when still on their products.

== Social impact ==
Beyond the toxicity risks to human health and the environment which are associated with first-generation nanomaterials, nanotechnology has broader societal impact and poses broader social challenges. Social scientists have suggested that nanotechnology's social issues should be understood and assessed not simply as "downstream" risks or impacts. Rather, the challenges should be factored into "upstream" research and decision-making in order to ensure technology development that meets social objectives

Many social scientists and organizations in civil society suggest that technology assessment and governance should also involve public participation. The exploration of the stakeholder's perception is also an essential component in assessing the large amount of risk associated with nanotechnology and nano-related products.

Over 800 nano-related patents were granted in 2003, with numbers increasing to nearly 19,000 internationally by 2012. Corporations are already taking out broad-ranging patents on nanoscale discoveries and inventions. For example, two corporations, NEC and IBM, hold the basic patents on carbon nanotubes, one of the current cornerstones of nanotechnology. Carbon nanotubes have a wide range of uses, and look set to become crucial to several industries from electronics and computers, to strengthened materials to drug delivery and diagnostics. Carbon nanotubes are poised to become a major traded commodity with the potential to replace major conventional raw materials.

Nanotechnologies may provide new solutions for the millions of people in developing countries who lack access to basic services, such as safe water, reliable energy, health care, and education. The 2004 UN Task Force on Science, Technology and Innovation noted that some of the advantages of nanotechnology include production using little labor, land, or maintenance, high productivity, low cost, and modest requirements for materials and energy. However, concerns are frequently raised that the claimed benefits of nanotechnology will not be evenly distributed, and that any benefits (including technical and/or economic) associated with nanotechnology will only reach affluent nations.

Longer-term concerns center on the impact that new technologies will have for society at large, and whether these could possibly lead to either a post-scarcity economy, or alternatively exacerbate the wealth gap between developed and developing nations. The effects of nanotechnology on the society as a whole, on human health and the environment, on trade, on security, on food systems and even on the definition of "human", have not been characterized or politicized.

== Regulation ==
Significant debate exists relating to the question of whether nanotechnology or nanotechnology-based products merit special government regulation. This debate is related to the circumstances in which it is necessary and appropriate to assess new substances prior to their release into the market, community and environment.

Regulatory bodies such as the United States Environmental Protection Agency and the Food and Drug Administration in the U.S. or the Health & Consumer Protection Directorate of the European Commission have started dealing with the potential risks posed by nanoparticles. So far, neither engineered nanoparticles nor the products and materials that contain them are subject to any special regulation regarding production, handling or labelling. The Material Safety Data Sheet that must be issued for some materials often does not differentiate between bulk and nanoscale size of the material in question and even when it does these MSDS are advisory only. The new advances and rapid growth within the field of nanotechnology have large implications, which in turn will lead to regulations, on the traditional food and agriculture sectors of the world, in particular the invention of smart and active packaging, nano sensors, nano pesticides, and nano fertilizers.

Limited nanotechnology labeling and regulation may exacerbate potential human and environmental health and safety issues associated with nanotechnology. It has been argued that the development of comprehensive regulation of nanotechnology will be vital to ensure that the potential risks associated with the research and commercial application of nanotechnology do not overshadow its potential benefits. Regulation may also be required to meet community expectations about responsible development of nanotechnology, as well as ensuring that public interests are included in shaping the development of nanotechnology.

In 2008, E. Marla Felcher "The Consumer Product Safety Commission and Nanotechnology," suggested that the Consumer Product Safety Commission, which is charged with protecting the public against unreasonable risks of injury or death associated with consumer products, is ill-equipped to oversee the safety of complex, high-tech products made using nanotechnology.

== See also ==
- International Center for Technology Assessment
