= Project on Emerging Nanotechnologies =

Project Logo

The Project on Emerging Nanotechnologies was established in 2005 as a partnership between the Woodrow Wilson International Center for Scholars and the Pew Charitable Trusts. The Project was intended to address the social, political, and public safety aspects of nanotechnology. It intended in particular to look for research and policy gaps and opportunities in knowledge and regulatory processes, and to develop strategies for closing them. The project worked with multiple U.S. and foreign governments and organizations.

The project's stated goal was "to inform the debate and to create an active public and policy dialogue. It was not an advocate either for, or against, particular nanotechnologies. Rather, the Project sought to ensure that as these technologies are developed, potential human health and environmental risks were anticipated, properly understood, and effectively managed."

== Publications ==
They have produced many publications on the various aspects of nanotechnology policy. One of the notable reports is on Managing the Effects of Nanotechnology, written by J. Clarence (Terry) Davies in 2006. They also maintain several online databases including the widely cited consumer products inventory, the Nanotechnology Health and Environmental Implications: An inventory of current research as well as a series of PEN Reports. Their work has also been published in academic journals such as Nature Nanotechnology.

A major activity of the Project was testimony on public forums.

== Staff ==
- David Rejeski, director, also the Director of the Foresight and Governance Project at the Woodrow Wilson Center, an initiative designed to facilitate long-term thinking and planning in the public sector.
- Todd Kuiken, Policy Associate
- Eleonore Pauwels, Visiting Scholar

The Advisory Board included Linda J. Fisher, Vice President and Chief sustainability officer at DuPont, Margaret A. Hamburg M.D., Vice President for Biological Programs, Nuclear Threat Initiative, Donald Kennedy, editor-in-chief of Science magazine and president emeritus and Bing Professor of Environmental Science, Emeritus, at Stanford University, John Ryan is Director of the Bionanotechnology IRC at Oxford University, and Stan Williams, senior fellow and director of quantum science research at Hewlett-Packard.
