= Nanomedicine =

Medical application of nanotechnology

Nanomedicine or nanotherapeutics is the medical application of nanotechnology, translating historic nanoscience insights and inventions into practical application. Nanomedicine ranges from the medical applications of nanomaterials and biological devices, to nanoelectronic biosensors, and even possible future applications of molecular nanotechnology such as biological machines. Current problems for nanomedicine involve understanding the issues related to toxicity and environmental impact of nanoscale materials (materials whose structure is on the scale of nanometers, i.e. billionths of a meter).

A ribosome is a biological machine based upon nanoscale protein domain dynamics, leading Richard Feynman to suggest a medical use for nanotechnology. Such motions can only now be seen by neutron spin echo spectroscopy.

Functionalities can be added to nanomaterials by interfacing them with biological molecules or structures. The size of nanomaterials is similar to that of most biological molecules and structures; therefore, nanomaterials can be useful for both in vivo and in vitro biomedical research and applications. Thus far, the integration of nanomaterials with biology has led to the development of diagnostic devices, contrast agents, analytical tools, physical therapy applications, and drug delivery vehicles.

Nanomedicine seeks to deliver a valuable set of research tools and clinically useful devices in the near future. The National Nanotechnology Initiative expects new commercial applications in the pharmaceutical industry that may include advanced drug delivery systems, new therapies, and in vivo imaging. Nanomedicine research is receiving funding from the US National Institutes of Health Common Fund program, supporting four nanomedicine development centers. The goal of funding this newer form of science is to further develop the biological, biochemical, and biophysical mechanisms of living tissues. More medical and drug companies today are becoming involved in nanomedical research and medications. These include Bristol-Myers Squibb, which focuses on drug delivery systems for immunology and fibrotic diseases; Moderna known for their COVID-19 vaccine and their work on mRNA therapeutics; and Nanobiotix, a company that focuses on cancer and currently has a drug in testing that increases the effect of radiation on targeted cells. More companies include Generation Bio, which specializes in genetic medicines and has developed the cell-targeted lipid nanoparticle, and Jazz Pharmaceuticals, which developed Vyxeos, a drug that treats acute myeloid leukemia, and concentrates on cancer and neuroscience. Cytiva is a company that specializes in producing delivery systems for genomic medicines that are non-viral, including mRNA vaccines and other therapies utilizing nucleic acid and Ratiopharm is known for manufacturing Pazenir, a drug for various cancers. Finally, Pacira specializes in pain management and is known for producing ZILRETTA for osteoarthritis knee pain, the first treatment without opioids.

Nanomedicine sales reached $16 billion in 2015, with a minimum of $3.8 billion in nanotechnology R&D being invested every year. Global funding for emerging nanotechnology increased by 45% per year in recent years, with product sales exceeding $1 trillion in 2013. In 2023, the global market was valued at $189.55 billion and is predicted to exceed $500 billion in the next ten years. As the nanomedicine industry continues to grow, it is expected to have a significant impact on the economy.

== Drug delivery ==
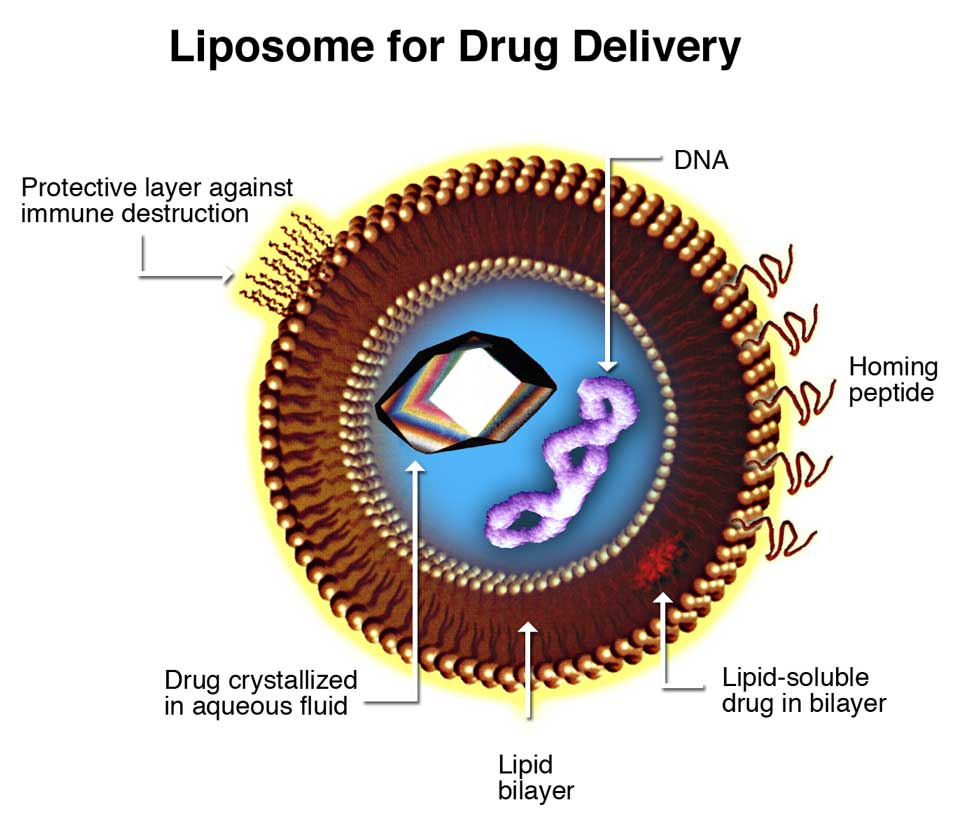
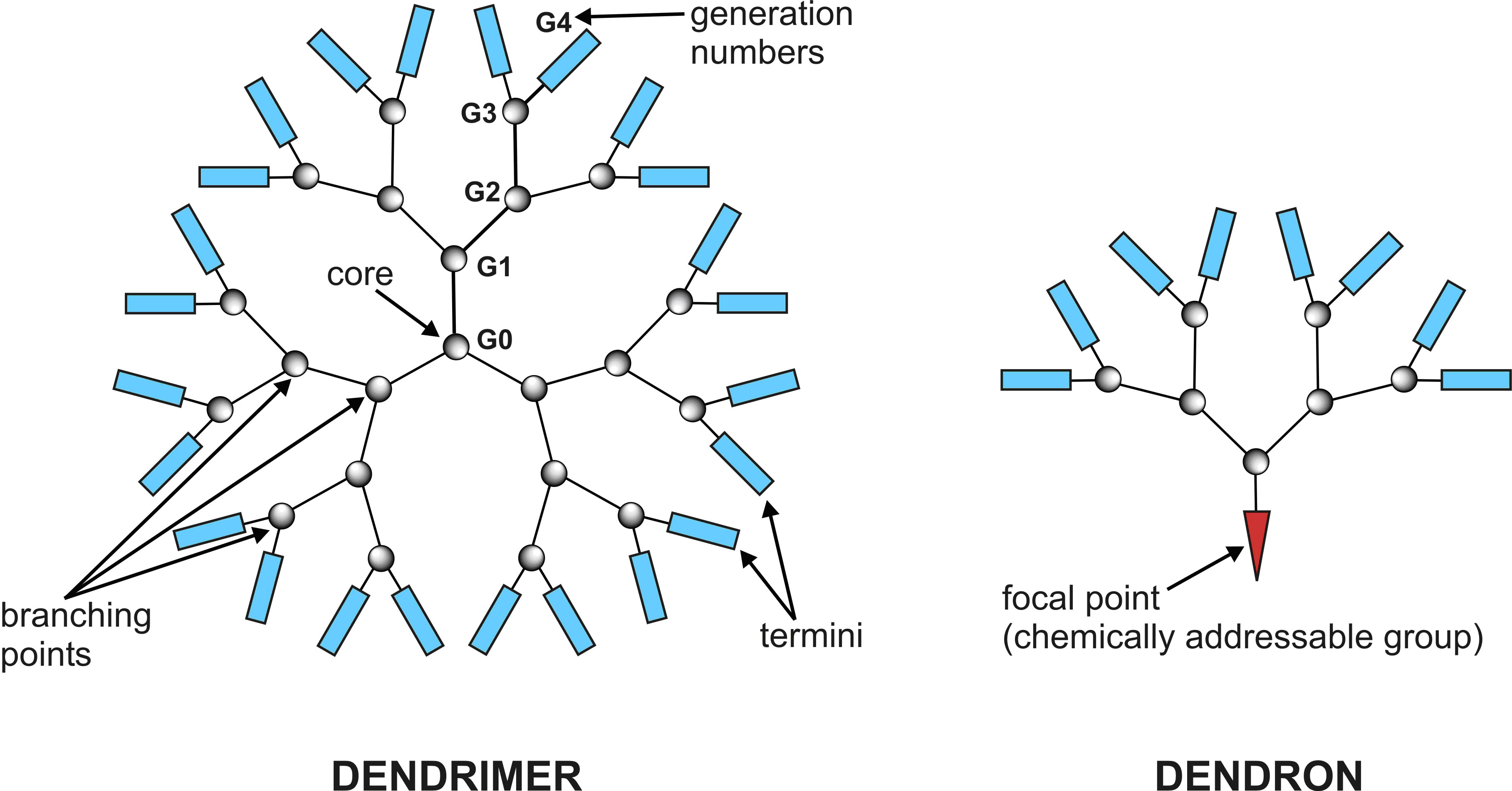
Nanoparticles (top), liposomes (middle), and dendrimers (bottom) are some nanomaterials being investigated for use in nanomedicine.

Nanotechnology has provided the possibility of delivering drugs to specific cells using nanoparticles. This use of drug delivery systems was first proposed by Gregory Gregoriadis in 1974, who outlined liposomes as a drug delivery system for chemotherapy. The overall drug consumption and side-effects may be lowered significantly by depositing the active pharmaceutical agent in the diseased region only and in no higher dose than needed. Targeted drug delivery is intended to reduce the side effects of drugs in tandem decreases in consumption and treatment expenses. Additionally, targeted drug delivery reduces the side effects of crude or naturally occurring drugs by minimizing undesired exposure to healthy cells. Drug delivery focuses on maximizing bioavailability both at specific places in the body and over a period of time. This can potentially be achieved by molecular targeting by nanoengineered devices. A benefit of using nanoscale for medical technologies is that smaller devices are less invasive and can possibly be implanted inside the body, plus biochemical reaction times are much shorter. These devices are faster and more sensitive than typical drug delivery. The efficacy of drug delivery through nanomedicine is largely based upon: a) efficient encapsulation of the drugs, b) successful delivery of drug to the targeted region of the body, and c) successful release of the drug. Several nano-delivery drugs were on the market by 2019.

Drug delivery systems, lipid- or polymer-based nanoparticles, can be designed to improve the pharmacokinetics and biodistribution of the drug. However, the pharmacokinetics and pharmacodynamics of nanomedicine is highly variable among different patients. When designed to avoid the body's defense mechanisms, nanoparticles have beneficial properties that can be used to improve drug delivery. Complex drug delivery mechanisms are being developed, including the ability to get drugs through cell membranes and into cell cytoplasm. Triggered response is one way for drug molecules to be used more efficiently. Drugs are placed in the body and only activate on encountering a particular signal. For example, a drug with poor solubility will be replaced by a drug delivery system where both hydrophilic and hydrophobic environments exist, improving the solubility. Drug delivery systems may also be able to prevent tissue damage through regulated drug release; reduce drug clearance rates; or lower the volume of distribution and reduce the effect on non-target tissue. However, the biodistribution of these nanoparticles is still imperfect due to the complex host's reactions to nano- and microsized materials and the difficulty in targeting specific organs in the body. Nevertheless, a lot of work is still ongoing to optimize and better understand the potential and limitations of nanoparticulate systems. While advancement of research proves that targeting and distribution can be augmented by nanoparticles, the dangers of nanotoxicity become an important next step in further understanding of their medical uses. The toxicity of nanoparticles varies, depending on size, shape, and material. These factors also affect the build-up and organ damage that may occur. Nanoparticles are made to be long-lasting, but this causes them to be trapped within organs, specifically the liver and spleen, as they cannot be broken down or excreted. This build-up of non-biodegradable material has been observed to cause organ damage and inflammation in mice. Delivering magnetic nanoparticles to a tumor using uneven stationary magnetic fields may lead to enhanced tumor growth. In order to avoid this, alternating electromagnetic fields should be used.

Nanoparticles are under research for their potential to decrease antibiotic resistance or for various antimicrobial uses. Nanoparticles might also be used to circumvent multidrug resistance (MDR) mechanisms.

=== Systems under research ===
Advances in lipid nanotechnology were instrumental in engineering medical nanodevices and novel drug delivery systems, as well as in developing sensing applications. Another system for microRNA delivery under preliminary research is nanoparticles formed by the self-assembly of two different microRNAs to possibly shrink tumors. One potential application is based on small electromechanical systems, such as nanoelectromechanical systems being investigated for the active release of drugs and sensors for possible cancer treatment with iron nanoparticles or gold shells. Another system of drug delivery involving nanoparticles is the use of aquasomes, self-assembled nanoparticles with a nanocrystalline center, a coating made of a polyhydroxyl oligomer, covered in the desired drug, which protects it from dehydration and conformational change.

== Manufacturing of Nanomedicines ==
The manufacturing of nanomedicines like lipid nanoparticles (LNPs), mRNA-loaded LNPs, liposomes and magnetic nanocarriers requires precise control of particle size, surface properties and encapsulation efficiency for a safe in vivo use and reproducible efficacy of the therapeutic. Traditionally, these nanoformulations have been manufactured using batch processes, which can have limitations such as variability in product quality and limited scalability due to the limited mixing efficiency in batch processes. In contrast, more modern approaches rely on continuous manufacturing techniques to enhance scalability and reproducability. Microfluidic methods and other rapid mixing methods enable improved control over key process parameters during the nanoparticle formation. These techniques allow the continuous production of reproducible nanoparticles with narrow size distributions and highly scalable throughput.

The large-scale production of mRNA-LNP Covid-19 vaccines (Comirnaty® and Spikevax®) relies on continuous processes like T-mixing (turbulent mixing). This method enables a efficient encapsulation of mRNA and a high throughput which was critical for mass vaccine production during Covid-19. However, scalability rely on parallelization of T-Mixers with multiple parallel operating pumps as the T-mixing is not scalable by increasing the inner dimensions of the T-Mixer. Characterization of Comirnaty® shows a broad particle size distribution (PDI ≥ 0,2), which is acceptable for vaccines but is suboptimal for small-molecule drugs due to higher regulatory requirements. To produce more refined LNPs with narrower size distributions, microfluidic mixers are increasingly employed which can enable more uniform LNPs and a higher scalability due to there inner microfluidic structure as demonstrated in multiple recent studies.

== Applications ==
Some nanotechnology-based drugs that are commercially available or in human clinical trials include:

- Doxil was originally approved by the FDA for the use on HIV-related Kaposi's sarcoma. It is now being used to also treat ovarian cancer and multiple myeloma. The drug is encased in liposomes, which helps to extend the life of the drug that is being distributed. Liposomes are self-assembling, spherical, closed colloidal structures that are composed of lipid bilayers that surround an aqueous space. The liposomes also help to increase the functionality and it helps to decrease the damage that the drug does to the heart muscles specifically.
- Onivyde, liposome encapsulated irinotecan to treat metastatic pancreatic cancer, was approved by FDA in October 2015.
- Rapamune is a nanocrystal-based drug that was approved by the FDA in 2000 to prevent organ rejection after transplantation. The nanocrystal components allow for increased drug solubility and dissolution rate, leading to improved absorption and high bioavailability.
- Cabenuva is approved by FDA as cabotegravir extended-release injectable nano-suspension, plus rilpivirine extended-release injectable nano-suspension. It is indicated as a complete regimen for the treatment of HIV-1 infection in adults to replace the current antiretroviral regimen in those who are virologically suppressed (HIV-1 RNA less than 50 copies per mL) on a stable antiretroviral regimen with no history of treatment failure and with no known or suspected resistance to either cabotegravir or rilpivirine. This is the first FDA-approved injectable, complete regimen for HIV-1 infected adults that is administered once a month.

== Imaging ==
In vivo imaging is another area where tools and devices are being developed. Using nanoparticle contrast agents, images such as ultrasound and MRI have a better distribution and improved contrast. In cardiovascular imaging, nanoparticles have potential to aid visualization of blood pooling, ischemia, angiogenesis, atherosclerosis, and focal areas where inflammation is present.

The small size of nanoparticles gives them with properties that can be very useful in oncology, particularly in imaging. Quantum dots (nanoparticles with quantum confinement properties, such as size-tunable light emission), when used in conjunction with MRI (magnetic resonance imaging), can produce exceptional images of tumor sites. Nanoparticles of cadmium selenide (quantum dots) glow when exposed to ultraviolet light. When injected, they seep into cancer tumors. The surgeon can see the glowing tumor, and use it as a guide for more accurate tumor removal. These nanoparticles are much brighter than organic dyes and only need one light source for activation. This means that the use of fluorescent quantum dots could produce a higher contrast image and at a lower cost than today's organic dyes used as contrast media. The downside, however, is that quantum dots are usually made of quite toxic elements, but this concern may be addressed by use of fluorescent dopants, substances added to create fluorescence.

Tracking movement can help determine how well drugs are being distributed or how substances are metabolized. It is difficult to track a small group of cells throughout the body, so scientists used to dye the cells. These dyes needed to be excited by light of a certain wavelength in order for them to light up. While different color dyes absorb different frequencies of light, there was a need for as many light sources as cells. A way around this problem is with luminescent tags. These tags are quantum dots attached to proteins that penetrate cell membranes. The dots can be random in size, can be made of bio-inert material, and they demonstrate the nanoscale property that color is size-dependent. As a result, sizes are selected so that the frequency of light used to make a group of quantum dots fluoresce is an even multiple of the frequency required to make another group incandesce. Then both groups can be lit with a single light source. They have also found a way to insert nanoparticles into the affected parts of the body so that those parts of the body will glow showing the tumor growth or shrinkage or also organ trouble.

== Sensing ==
Nanotechnology-on-a-chip is one more dimension of lab-on-a-chip technology. Magnetic nanoparticles, bound to a suitable antibody, are used to label specific molecules, structures or microorganisms. Silica nanoparticles, in particular, are inert from a photophysical perspective and can accumulate a large number of dye(s) within their shells. Gold nanoparticles tagged with short DNA segments can be used to detect genetic sequences in a sample. Multicolor optical coding for biological assays has been achieved by embedding different-sized quantum dots into polymeric microbeads. Nanopore technology for analysis of nucleic acids converts strings of nucleotides directly into electronic signatures.

Sensor test chips containing thousands of nanowires, able to detect proteins and other biomarkers left behind by cancer cells, could enable the detection and diagnosis of cancer in the early stages from a few drops of a patient's blood. Nanotechnology is helping to advance the use of arthroscopes, which are pencil-sized devices that are used in surgeries with lights and cameras so surgeons can do the surgeries with smaller incisions. The smaller the incisions the faster the healing time which is better for the patients. It is also helping to find a way to make an arthroscope smaller than a strand of hair.

Research on nanoelectronics-based cancer diagnostics could lead to tests that can be done in pharmacies. The results promise to be highly accurate and the product promises to be inexpensive. They could take a very small amount of blood and detect cancer anywhere in the body in about five minutes, with a sensitivity that is a thousand times better a conventional laboratory test. These devices are built with nanowires to detect cancer proteins; each nanowire detector is primed to be sensitive to a different cancer marker. The biggest advantage of the nanowire detectors is that they could test for anywhere from ten to one hundred similar medical conditions without adding cost to the testing device. Nanotechnology has also helped to personalize oncology for the detection, diagnosis, and treatment of cancer. It is now able to be tailored to each individual's tumor for better performance. They have found ways that they will be able to target a specific part of the body that is being affected by cancer.

== Sepsis treatment ==
In contrast to dialysis, which works on the principle of the size-related diffusion of solutes and ultrafiltration of fluid across a semi-permeable membrane, the purification using nanoparticles allows specific targeting of substances. Additionally, larger compounds which are commonly not dialyzable can be removed.

The purification process is based on functionalized iron oxide or carbon coated metal nanoparticles with ferromagnetic or superparamagnetic properties. Binding agents such as proteins, antibiotics, or synthetic ligands are covalently linked to the particle surface. These binding agents are able to interact with target species forming an agglomerate. Applying an external magnetic field gradient exerts a force on the nanoparticles, allowing them to be separated from the bulk fluid, thus removing contaminants. This can neutralize the toxicity of sepsis, but runs the risk of nephrotoxicity and neurotoxicity.

The small size (< 100 nm) and large surface area of functionalized nanomagnets offer advantages properties compared to hemoperfusion, which is a clinically used technique for the purification of blood and is based on surface adsorption. These advantages include high loading capacity, high selectivity towards the target compound, fast diffusion, low hydrodynamic resistance, and low dosage requirements.

== Tissue engineering ==
Nanotechnology may be used as part of tissue engineering to help reproduce, repair, or reshape damaged tissue using suitable nanomaterial-based scaffolds and growth factors. If successful, tissue engineering may replace conventional treatments like organ transplants or artificial implants. Nanoparticles such as graphene, carbon nanotubes, molybdenum disulfide and tungsten disulfide are being used as reinforcing agents to fabricate mechanically strong biodegradable polymeric nanocomposites for bone tissue engineering applications. The addition of these nanoparticles to the polymer matrix at low concentrations (~0.2 weight %) significantly improves in the compressive and flexural mechanical properties of polymeric nanocomposites. These nanocomposites may potentially serve as novel, mechanically strong, lightweight bone implants.

For example, a flesh welder was demonstrated to fuse two pieces of chicken meat into a single piece using a suspension of gold-coated nanoshells activated by an infrared laser. This could be used to weld arteries during surgery. Another example is nanonephrology, the use of nanomedicine on the kidney.

The full potential and implications of nanotechnology uses within the tissue engineering are not yet fully understood, despite research spanning the past two decades.

== Vaccine development ==
Today, a significant proportion of vaccines against viral diseases are created using nanotechnology. Solid lipid nanoparticles represent a novel delivery system for some vaccines against SARS-CoV-2 (the virus that causes COVID-19). In recent decades, nanosized adjuvants have been widely used to enhance immune responses to targeted vaccine antigens. Inorganic nanoparticles of aluminum, silica and clay, as well as organic nanoparticles based on polymers and lipids, are commonly used adjuvants within modern vaccine formulations. Nanoparticles of natural polymers such as chitosan are commonly used adjuvants in modern vaccine formulations. Ceria nanoparticles appear very promising for both enhancing vaccine responses and mitigating inflammation, as their adjuvanticity can be adjusted by modifying parameters such as size, crystallinity, surface state, and stoichiometry.

In addition, virus-like nanoparticles are also being researched. These structures allow vaccines to self-assemble without encapsulating viral RNA, making them non-infectious and incapable of replication. These virus-like nanoparticles are designed to elicit a strong immune response by using a self-assembled layer of virus capsid proteins.

== Regulation ==
As the development of nanomedicine continues to develop as a potential treatment for diseases, regulatory challenges have assessed reproducible manufacturing processes, scalability, availability of appropriate characterization methods, safety issues, and poor understanding of disease heterogeneity and patient preselection strategies. Global interaction of the various stakeholders is leading to harmonized regulation.

Several therapeutic nanomedicine products have been approved by the FDA and European Medicines Agency. For market approval, these therapies are evaluated for biocompatibility, immunotoxicity, and a preclinical assessment.

== See also ==
- British Society for Nanomedicine
- Biopharmaceutical
- Colloidal gold
- Heart nanotechnology
- IEEE P1906.1 – Recommended Practice for Nanoscale and Molecular Communication Framework
- Impalefection
- Monitoring (medicine)
- Nanobiotechnology
- Nanoparticle–biomolecule conjugate
- Nanozymes
- Nanotechnology in fiction
- Photodynamic therapy
- Top-down and bottom-up design
