= Amphiphile =

Chemical compound with both hydrophilic and lipophilic properties

Phospholipids, such as this glycerophospholipid, have amphipathic character.

Cross-section view of the structures that can be formed by biological amphiphiles in aqueous solutions. Unlike this illustration, micelles are usually formed by non-biological, single-chain, amphiphiles, soaps or detergents, since it is difficult to fit two chains into this shape

In chemistry, an amphiphile (from Greek αμφις (amphis) 'both' and φιλíα (philia) 'love, friendship'), also referred to as an amphipath, is a dipolar chemical compound possessing both hydrophilic (water-loving, polar) and lipophilic (fat-loving, nonpolar) properties within the same molecule. Such compound is called amphiphilic or amphipathic. This dipolar characteristic implies the existence of different chemical groups forming spatially segregated regions with contrasting surface polarity. Amphiphilic compounds include surfactants, detergents, block copolymers, and Janus particles.

In aqueous solutions, amphiphiles are able to self-assemble to form a wide range of supramolecular structures, including micelles, lamellae, nanofibers, and biological membranes.

Phospholipid amphiphiles constitute a significant class of biological amphiphiles composed of a polar-phosphate based head group and two hydrophobic fatty acid chains. Phospholipid bilayers are the major structural component of cell membranes, and serve as the basis for a number of research areas including chemistry and biochemistry, notably that of lipid polymorphism.

Organic compounds containing hydrophilic groups at both ends of the molecule are called bolaamphiphiles. They are distinguished from the conventional head-tail amphiphiles by the prolate geometry of the micelles they form in aggregation.

== Structure ==
The lipophilic group is typically a large hydrocarbon moiety, such as a long chain of the form CH_{3}(CH_{2})_{n}, with n > 4.

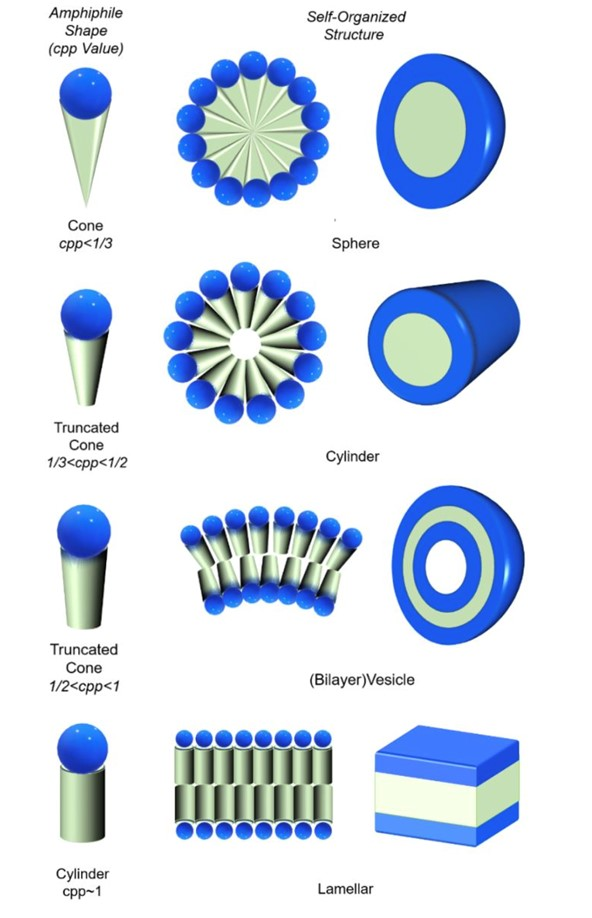
The shape of an amphiphile in relation to the self-assembled peptide structure. Shows each corresponding molecular structure and aggregate curvature.

The hydrophilic group falls into one of the following categories:

1. charged groups
  - anionic. Examples, with the lipophilic part of the molecule represented by R, are:
    - carboxylates: RCO_{2}^{−}
    - sulfates: RSO_{4}^{−}
    - sulfonates: RSO_{3}^{−}
    - phosphates (the charged functional group in phospholipids)
  - cationic. Examples:
    - ammoniums: RNH_{3}^{+}
2. polar, uncharged groups. Examples are alcohols with large R groups, such as diacyl glycerol (DAG), and oligo ethylene glycol with long alkyl chains.

Often, amphiphilic species have several lipophilic parts, several hydrophilic parts, or several of both. Proteins and some block copolymers are such examples.

Amphiphilic compounds have lipophilic (typically hydrocarbon) structures and hydrophilic polar functional groups (either ionic or uncharged).

As a result of having both lipophilic and hydrophilic portions, some amphiphilic compounds may dissolve in water and to some extent in non-polar organic solvents.

When placed in an immiscible biphasic system consisting of aqueous and organic solvents, the amphiphilic compound will partition the two phases. The extent of the hydrophobic and hydrophilic portions determines the extent of partitioning.

== Biological role ==
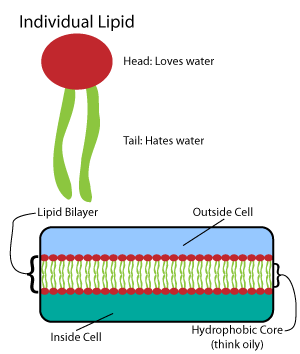
The lipid bilayer, the material that makes up cell membranes.

Phospholipids, a class of amphiphilic molecules, are the main components of biological membranes. The amphiphilic nature of these molecules defines the way in which they form membranes. They arrange themselves into lipid bilayers, by forming a sheet composed of two layers of lipids. Each layer forms by positioning their lypophilic chains to the same side of the layer. The two layers then stack such that their lyphphilic chains touch on the inside and their polar groups are outside facing the surrounding aqueous media. Thus the inside of the bilayer sheet is a non-polar region sandwiched between the two polar sheets.

Although phospholipids are the principal constituents of biological membranes, there are other constituents, such as cholesterol and glycolipids, which are also included in these structures and give them different physical and biological properties.

Many other amphiphilic compounds, such as pepducins, strongly interact with biological membranes by insertion of the hydrophobic part into the lipid membrane, while exposing the hydrophilic part to the aqueous medium, altering their physical behavior and sometimes disrupting them.

Aβ proteins form antiparallel β sheets which are strongly amphiphilic, and which aggregate to form toxic oxidative Aβ fibrils. Aβ fibrils themselves are composed of amphiphilic 13-mer modular β sandwiches separated by reverse turns. Hydropathic waves optimize the description of the small (40,42 aa) plaque-forming (aggregative) Aβ fragments.

Antimicrobial peptides (AMPs) are another class of amphiphilic molecules, a big data analysis showed that amphipathicity best distinguished between AMPs with and without anti-gram-negative bacteria activities. The higher amphipathicity, the better chances for AMPs possessing antibacterial and antifungal dual activities.

== Examples ==
There are several examples of molecules that present amphiphilic properties:

Hydrocarbon-based surfactants are a group of synthetic amphiphilic compounds in which their polar region can be either ionic, or non-ionic. Some common members of this group are: sodium dodecyl sulfate (anionic), benzalkonium chloride (cationic), cocamidopropyl betaine (zwitterionic), and 1-octanol (long-chain alcohol, non-ionic).

Many biological compounds are amphiphilic: phospholipids, cholesterol, glycolipids, fatty acids, bile acids, saponins, local anaesthetics, etc.

Soap is a common household amphiphilic surfactant compound. Soap mixed with water (polar, hydrophilic) is useful for cleaning oils and fats (non-polar, lipophilic) from kitchenware, dishes, skin, clothing, etc.

Examples of Amphiphilic Molecules
Category	Examples	Primary Function	Polar Head Group
Synthetic surfactants	Sodium dodecyl sulfate (SDS), Benzalkonium chloride, Cocamidopropyl betaine	Detergents, cleaning, antimicrobial applications	Anionic, cationic, or zwitterionic
Membrane lipids (biological)	Phospholipids, cholesterol, glycolipids	Formation and regulation of cell membranes	Zwitterionic or weakly polar
Bile acids	Cholic acid, deoxycholic acid	Emulsification of dietary fats	Carboxyl + hydroxyl
Natural amphiphiles (plant-derived)	Saponins	Plant defense and foaming	Glycosidic (polar sugar)
Local anesthetic amphiphiles	Lidocaine, bupivacaine	Nerve conduction block via membrane insertion	Weakly basic amine
Fatty acids & soaps	Sodium stereate, sodium palmitate, oleic acid	Removal of oils and grease	Anionic (carboxylate)
Bolaamphiphiles	Archaeal membrane lipids, synthetic bolaforms	Membrane stabilization in archaea, drug delivery	Hydrophilic groups in both ends
Block copolymers	PEG-PLA, PEG-PCL	Drug delivery	Hydrophilic polymer block

== See also ==
- Amphoterism
- Bubbles in abiogenesis
- Emulsion
- Free surface energy
- Surfactant
- Lipid polymorphism
- Sodium dodecyl sulfate
- Wetting
- Viral envelope
- Molecular self assembly
