= Template-guided self-assembly =

Fabrication process

Template-guided self-assembly is a versatile fabrication process that can arrange various micrometer to nanometer sized particles into lithographically created template with defined patterns. The process contains the following four steps.

== Create Template ==
The "template" can be created by either photolithography or e-beam lithography to define binding sites for various building blocks. The binding sites should reflect the footprint of the building blocks or clusters to be bound.

== Surface Treatment ==
After film development, the created pattern is treated with charged polymers in order to “stick” the particles. Take poly-lysine as an example, the poly-lysine will cover the negatively charged glass surface and turn the charge to be positive; it thus can non-specifically bind negatively charged metallic nanoparticles.

== Particle Assembly ==
To do particle assembly, treated pattern is submerged in a small amount of aqueous solution of particles. A few approaches can be used to facilitate the binding efficiency. One of them is to use capillary force at the edge of the aqueous droplet to “push” the particles into the binding sites. If assembling multiple types of particles, the particles should be assembled in the order of decreasing sizes. For example, if assembling both 60 nm gold nanoparticles as well as 40 nm silver nanoparticles, 60 nm gold nanoparticles should be applied first because it is too big to enter binding sites tailored for 40 nm particles. Rationally design the binding sequence as well as the binding site sizes can result in minimizing the binding errors from occurring.

== Remove Template ==
After binding of all building blocks, the template can be removed by either dissolving in an organic solvent, or stripped off by a scotch tape.
