= Mahmoud Hashem Abdel-Kader =

Egyptian physical chemist

- Education: Alexandria University (BSc); Stuttgart University (PhD)
- Known for: Laser Spectroscopy, Photodynamic Therapy, Solar Energy Utilization
- Awards: 1995 National Incentive Award in Chemical Science; 1996 Distinguished State Prize in Chemistry; 1998 Egyptian State Medal in Chemistry; 2012 Excellence Award of Science from Cairo University; 2015 State Award in Advanced Technological Sciences; 2017 First-Class Medal of the President of Egypt in Science and Arts; 2023 Nile Award in Advanced Technological Sciences
- Scientific career
- Fields: Physical Chemistry, Photochemistry
- Doctoral advisor: Theodor Förster, Horst E.A. Kramer (Stuttgart)

Mahmoud Hashem Abdel-Kader is an Egyptian physical chemist and Professor of Photochemistry at Cairo University/NILES Institute. He founded the European Universities in Egypt.

== Education ==
Mahmoud Abdel-Kader received his BSc in Chemistry from Alexandria University in 1969, and was then associated with the Faculty of Science (chemistry) at Tanta University (initially a branch of Alexandria University, from 1972 on an independent university), where he performed "Spectroscopic Studies on Some Hydroxybenzanilides" and served as a teaching and research assistant (1970–1973). He was granted a DAAD scholarship in 1974 to perform doctoral studies in Germany and received his Ph.D. (Dr. rer. nat.) in "Spectroscopy and Photochemistry" from Stuttgart University in Germany in 1979. His doctoral studies were supervised by two German physicochemists, Theodor Förster († 1974) and his former scholar Horst E.A. Kramer. It included physicochemical investigations on the isomerization of a merocyanine (polymethine dye) of the stilbazolium betaine type and its corresponding acid

== Career ==
After a 3-years period as lecturer in physical chemistry at Tanta University (1979–1982) and a post-doctoral research period at the University of Karlsruhe, now the Karlsruhe Institute of Technology (Department of Physical Chemistry, 1982 to 1983), he was appointed as Visiting Senior Researcher at the École Polytechnique Fédérale de Lausanne (Switzerland) from 1983 to 1984. He joined the Arabian Gulf University in Bahrain (Professor of Physical Chemistry/Photochemistry at the Faculty of Applied Sciences, 1985–1992), then the United Arab Emirates University (Professor of Physical Chemistry/Photochemistry at the Faculty of Science, 1992–1995). Mahmoud Abdel-Kader served as Visiting Professor at the Georgia Institute of Technology in Atlanta (USA) and at the Institute for Laser Technology in Medicine and Metrology of Ulm University (Germany).

He joined Cairo University in 1992 and acted as Department Chairman and Vice Dean of the National Institute of Laser-Enhanced Sciences (NILES) until August 2002. He had been involved in the establishment of the German University in Cairo (GUC), where he served as first University President (until 2017).

== Research interests ==
Mahmoud Abdel-Kader's research interests are in:

- Laser spectroscopy to study the kinetics and mechanism of ultrafast chemical reaction (photochemical isomerization, protolytic reactions and electron transfer processes),
- Utilization of solar energy in photochemical conversions for malaria, filariasis and dengue fever vector control, for parasites such as schistosomiasis and agricultural pests using environmentally friendly (natural extract) photosensitizers, and
- Application of nanoparticles in photodynamic diagnosis and therapy of cancer.

== Projects, mentorship, published work and communications ==
Mahmoud Abdel-Kader is regarded as one of the experts in the field of modern photodynamic therapy (PDT) and the 2014-volume "Photodynamic Therapy: from Theory to Application", which he edited and to which he contributed as author, a summary in the various fields of PDT.

He has supervised approximately 90 master's theses and doctoral dissertations, and has published over 100 scientific communications in peer-reviewed journals and in conference proceedings. He is an inventor of 8 patents and has given more than 80 invited talks and plenary lectures at both national and international meetings.

== Honors and awards ==
Internationally, Mahmoud Abdel-Kader is mainly known in the photochemistry-related research field. He was elected Officer of the European Society for Photobiology in 1997, then served as "Chair outside Europe" until 2001. In September 2024 he was awarded an Honorary Doctorate of Science by The University of East London for his contributions to chemistry.

In Egypt, Mahmoud Abdel-Kader has received various honors and awards:

- (1995) National Incentive Award in Chemical Science
- (1996) Distinguished State Prize in Chemistry
- (1998) Egyptian State Medal in Chemistry
- (2012) Excellence Award of Science from Cairo University
- (2015) State Award Discretion in Advanced Technological Sciences
- (2015) Member of the Egyptian Scientific Institute
- (2017) First-Class Medal of the President of the Arab Republic of Egypt in Science and Arts
- (2023) The Nile Award in Advanced Technological Sciences
