= NCRUPAR =

Non-coding RNA found in humans

Identifiers
- Aliases: NCRUPAR, NCRNA00193, ncR-uPAR, non-protein coding RNA, upstream of F2R/PAR1
- External IDs: GeneCards: NCRUPAR
Orthologs
Databases	NCBI: entry
Species	Human	Mouse
Entrez	100302746	n/a
Ensembl	n/a	n/a
UniProt	n a	n/a
RefSeq (mRNA)	n/a	n/a
RefSeq (protein)	n/a	n/a
Location (UCSC)	n/a	n/a
PubMed search		n/a
- Wikidata
View/Edit Human

In molecular biology, non-protein coding RNA, upstream of F2R/PAR1, also known as NCRUPAR, is a long non-coding RNA. It is located upstream of the PAR-1 gene and upregulates PAR-1 expression.

== See also ==
- Long noncoding RNA
