= Nam-Trung Nguyen =

Vietnamese scientist

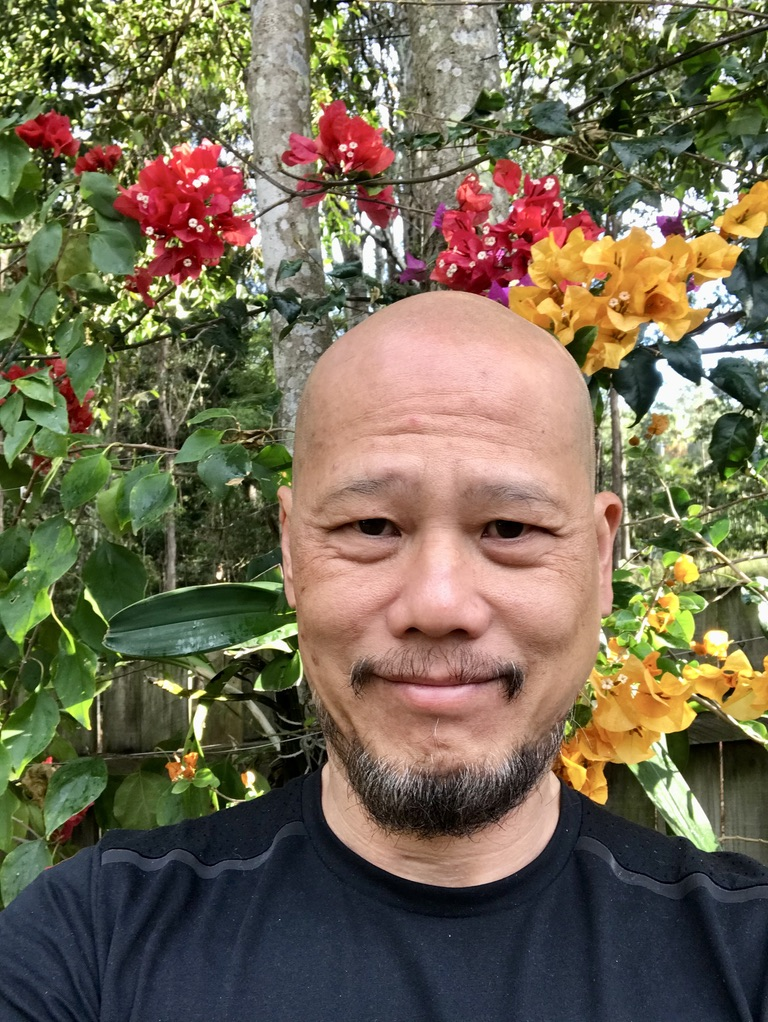
- Nam-Trung Nguyen
- Born: April 14, 1970 (age 56); Hanoi, Vietnam
- Education: Chemnitz University of Technology
- Known for: Sarin detector, PCR, Micromixer, Droplet-Based Microfluidics, Micro Magnetofluidics, Liquid Marbles, Micro Elastofluidics
- Scientific career
- Fields: Microfluidics, Nanofluidics
- Workplaces: Griffith University; Nanyang Technological University
- Academic advisors: Prof. Dr.-Ing. Wolfram Dötzel

Nam-Trung Nguyen (Vietnamese: Nguyễn Nam Trung; born on 14 April 1970) is a Vietnamese-Australian researcher in the fields of microfluidics and nanofluidics. He is notable for his work on nerve agent detectors, PCR, micromixers, droplet-based microfluidics, micro-magnetofluidics, liquid marbles and micro-elastofluidics. He is currently a professor and director of Queensland Micro and Nanotechnology Centre at Griffith University. He was a former associate professor at Nanyang Technological University, Singapore. Nguyen is a Fellow of ASME and a Senior Member of IEEE.

== Early life ==
Nguyen was born in 1970 in Hanoi, to an engineer father and schoolteacher mother. He started school in 1975, the year the Vietnam war ended. After graduating from high school, he took the entrance exam for Hanoi University of Science and Technology. With a high score in this examination, he was awarded a scholarship for overseas undergraduate education in the former Eastern Bloc. As one of the top-ranked candidates, he could select which country to go to. His father, an engineer trained in the Soviet Union, advised him to go to East Germany. After completing a German language course in Hanoi in 1987 and a preparation course in Zwickau in 1988, he started studying precision engineering and microsystems technology at Chemnitz University of Technology, Germany. The Eastern Bloc collapsed in 1989 when he was in the second year of his undergraduate study. He continued his study at the same university after the German reunification. During this time, he also worked part-time as a worker on an assembly line, data entry personnel at a bank and waiter at restaurants.

He worked as a student researcher at Robert Bosch GmbH, where he was introduced to micro-electromechanical systems (MEMS) for automotive applications. He contributed to the development of MEMS-based fuel injection systems as well as sensing systems for pressure and mass flow rate. Nguyen received his Dipl-Ing and Dr Ing degrees from Chemnitz University of Technology in 1993 and 1997, respectively. These formative years in post-war Vietnam and reunified Germany strongly shaped his character and career.

He returned to Chemnitz in 2004 to defend his habilitation degree. The habilitation degree (Dr Ing Habil) is the respected qualification for a full professorship in Germany. After the formal normalization of diplomatic relations between the United States and Vietnam in 1995, he could continue his training in the USA. Following the award of his doctoral degree in 1997, he moved to the US and worked as a postdoctoral research engineer in the Berkeley Sensor and Actuator Center (University of California, Berkeley, United States).

== Career ==
From 1999 to 2012, Nguyen was a research fellow, assistant professor and associate professor at Singapore’s Nanyang Technological University (NTU). He was also the Director of the successful part-time education program of the School of Mechanical and Aerospace Engineering at NTU. From 2000 to 2013, he led a competitive and independent research group at NTU. In 2013, he joined Griffith University in Australia and has been serving as a Professor and the Director of Queensland Micro- and Nanotechnology Centre. Nguyen has served as a member of the Australian Research Council College of Experts from 2014 to 2017 and is an active investigator for Australian industries through research contracts and Cooperative Research Centres.

Nguyen's work focuses on advancing fundamental fluid physics in microscale and applying those advancements to produce practical engineering solutions in the form of lab-on-a-chip and point-of-care diagnostics. He has three US patents (US7975531B2, US7736788B2, US7534097B2) covering microfluidics applications such as fuel cells and fluid instrumentation. Nguyen has established and developed a number of enabling technologies and fluid handling concepts, with international recognition particularly in polymeric micromachining, micro acoustofluidics, micro mixing and micro magnetofluidics. Nguyen has published over 470 articles in international journals, 9 books, 24 book chapters. He has supervised 36 PhD students to successful completion. The 2020 edition of the Research Special Report of The Australian recognized Nguyen as an Australia's research leader in analytical chemistry, and one of the top 17 scholars in chemical and material sciences.

In 2023, Nguyen was awarded with the Australian Laureate Fellowship, the most prestigious research fellowship of Australia. Nguyen is an elected Fellow of the American Society of Mechanical Engineers and a senior member of the Institute of Electrical and Electronics Engineers. His international reputation and leadership led to roles with key microfluidics and micro/nanotechnology journals of the field, including editor-in-chief (Micromachines), Associate Editor (Microfluidics and Nanofluidics), Biomedical Microdevices, Journal of Sensors and Sensor Systems, Journal of Science: Advanced Materials and Devices, Technologies and advisory board member of Lab on a Chip.

== Honors ==
Nguyen is the First Runner Up of Inaugural ProSPER.Net-Scopus Young Scientist Awards in Sustainable Development in 2009 and the Runner Up of ASAIHL-Scopus Young Scientist Awards in 2008.

The following is the full list of his achievements:

- 2024, Sir George Julius Medal, Engineers Australia
- 2023, ARC Australian Laureate Fellow
- 2020, 2021, 2022, 2023, 2024 Australia's research leader in analytical chemistry
- 2018, Vice Chancellor's Research Excellence Award for Research Leadership
- 2017, Pro Vice Chancellor's Research Excellence Award for Research Leadership
- 2014, Member of Australian Research Council College of Experts
- 2012, SMART Faculty Fellow, Singapore-MIT Alliance for Research and Technology

== Selected bibliography ==
- Nguyen, Nam-Trung (2011). Micromixers: Fundamentals, Design and Fabrication (2nd ed.). Elsevier. ISBN 9781437735215. Archived from the original on 2016-10-18.
- Nguyen, Nam-Trung; Abgrall, Patrick (2009). Nanofluidics. Artech House. ISBN 9781596933507.
- Nguyen, Nam-Trung (2009). "Micropumping and microvalving". In Jeffrey D. Zahn (ed.). Methods in Bioengineering: Biomicrofabrication and Biomicrofluidics. Boston: Artech House. ISBN 9781596934009.
- Nguyen, Nam-Trung; Wu, Zhigang (2005). "Micromixers—a review". Journal of Micromechanics and Microengineering. 15 (2): R1–R16. doi:10.1088/0960-1317/15/2/R01. S2CID 16772224.
