= EUE =

EUE may refer to:

- Elliot Unger and Elliot, an American commercial production company
- European Universities in Egypt, an international university institution in the New Administrative Capital of Egypt
- EUE Editions Universitaires Européennes, a German publishing company
- Eureka Airport (Nevada)
- Euskal Ezkerra, a political party in the Basque Country, Spain
- Exotic ungulate encephalopathy
- Expected unserved energy, an electric grid reliability index
