= Nanoparticle–biomolecule conjugate =

Biological drug delivery modality

Attachments on nanoparticles make them more biocompatible.

A nanoparticle–biomolecule conjugate is a nanoparticle with biomolecules attached to its surface. Nanoparticles are minuscule particles, typically measured in nanometers (nm), that are used in nanobiotechnology to explore the functions of biomolecules. Properties of the ultrafine particles are characterized by the components on their surfaces more so than larger structures, such as cells, due to large surface area-to-volume ratios. Large surface area-to-volume-ratios of nanoparticles optimize the potential for interactions with biomolecules.

== Characterization ==
Major characteristics of nanoparticles include volume, structure, and visual properties that make them valuable in nanobiotechnology. Depending on specific properties of size, structure, and luminescence, nanoparticles can be used for different applications. Imaging techniques are used to identify such properties and give more information about the tested sample. Techniques used to characterize nanoparticles are also useful in studying how nanoparticles interact with biomolecules, such as amino acids or DNA, and include magnetic resonance imaging (MRI), denoted by the solubility of the nanoparticles in water and fluorescent. MRI can be applied in the medical field to visualize structures; atomic force microscopy (AFM) that gives a topographic view of the sample on a substrate; transmission electron microscopy (TEM) that gives a top view, but with a different technique then that of atomic force microscopy; Raman spectroscopy or surface enhanced Raman spectroscopy (SERS) gives information about wavelengths and energy in the sample. ultraviolet-visible spectroscopy (UV-Vis) measures the wavelengths where light is absorbed; X-ray diffraction (XRD) generally gives an idea of the chemical composition of the sample. To quantify protein attachment to nanoparticles, assays such as the Bicinchoninic Acid (BCA) assay and Bradford assay are employed, providing a measure of the average protein labelling per nanoparticle.

== Chemistry ==
=== Physical ===
Nanomolecules can be created from virtually any element, but the majority produced in today's industry use carbon as the basis upon which the molecules are built around. Carbon can bond with nearly any element, allowing many possibilities when it comes to creating a specific molecule. Scientists can create thousands upon thousands of individual nanomolecules from a simple carbon basis. Some of the most famous nanomolecules currently in existence are solely carbon; these include carbon nanotubes and buckminsterfullerenes. In contrast with nanomolecules, the chemical components of nanoparticles usually consist of metals, such as iron, gold, silver, and platinum.

Interactions between nanoparticles and molecules change depending on the nanoparticle's core. Nanoparticle properties depend not only on the composition of the core material, but also on varying thicknesses of material used. Magnetic properties are particularly useful in molecule manipulation, and thus metals are often used as core material. Metals contain inherent magnetic properties that allow for manipulation of molecular assembly. As nanoparticles interact with molecules via ligand properties, molecular assembly can be controlled by external magnetic fields interacting with magnetic properties in the nanoparticles. Significant problems with producing nanoparticles initially arise once these nanoparticles are generated in solution. Without the use of a stabilizing agent, nanoparticles tend to stick together once the stirring is stopped. In order to counteract this, a certain collidial stabilizer is generally added. These stabilizers bind to the nanoparticles in a way that prevents other particles from bonding with them. Some effective stabilizers found so far include citrate, cellulose, and sodium borohydride.

=== Application chemistry ===
Nanoparticles are desirable in today's industry for their high surface area-to-volume ratio in comparison with larger particles of the same elements. Because chemical reactions occur at a rate directly proportional to the available surface area of reactant compounds, nanoparticles can generate reactions at a much faster rate than larger particles of equal mass. Nanoparticles therefore are among the most efficient means of producing reactions and are inherently valuable in the chemical industry. The same property makes them valuable in interactions with molecules.

== Applications with biomolecules and biological processes ==
Nanoparticles have the potential to greatly influence biological processes. The potency of a nanoparticle increases as its surface area-to-volume-ratio does. Attachments of ligands to the surface of nanoparticles allow them to interact with biomolecules.

=== Identification of biomolecules ===
Nanoparticles are valuable tools in identification of biomolecules, through the use of bio-tagging or labeling. Attachments of ligands or molecular coatings to the surface of a nanoparticle facilitate nanoparticle-molecule interaction, and make them biocompatible. Conjugation can be achieved through intermolecular attractions between the nanoparticle and biomolecule such as covalent bonding, chemisorption, and noncovalent interactions.

To enhance visualization, nanoparticles can also be made to fluoresce by controlling the size and shape of a nanoparticle probe. Fluorescence increases luminescence by increasing the range of wavelengths the emitted light can reach, allowing for biomarkers with a variety of colors. This technique is used to track the efficacy of protein transfer both in vivo and in vitro in terms of genetic alternations.

=== Biological process control ===
Biological processes can be controlled through transcription regulation, gene regulation, and enzyme inhibition processes that can be regulated using nanoparticles. Nanoparticles can play a part in gene regulation through ionic bonding between positively charged cationic ligands on the surfaces of nanoparticles and negatively charged anionic nucleic acids present in DNA. In an experiment, a nanoparticle-DNA complex inhibited transcription by T7 RNA polymerase, signifying strong bonding in the complex. A high affinity of the nanoparticle-DNA complex indicates strong bonding and a favorable use of nanoparticles. Attaching ionic ligands to nanoparticles allows control over enzyme activity. An example of enzyme inhibition is given by binding of a-chymotrypsin (ChT), an enzyme with a largely cationic active site. When a-chymotrypsin is incubated with anionic (negatively charged) nanoparticles, ChT activity is inhibited as anionic nanoparticles bind to the active site. Enzyme activity can be restored by the addition of cationic surfactants. Alkyl surfactants form a bilayer around ChT, whereas thiol and alcohol surfactants alter the surface of ChT such that interactions with nanoparticles are interrupted. Though formation of a protein-nanoparticle complex can inhibit enzyme activity, studies show that it can also stabilize protein structure, and significantly protect the protein from denaturization. Experimental and theoretical analyses have also shown that nanoparticles may suppress unfavorable lateral interactions among the adsorbed proteins, thereby leading to significant enhancements in their stability under denaturing conditions. Attachments of ligands to segments of nanoparticles selected for functionalization of metallic properties can be used to generate a magnetic nanowire, which generates a magnetic field that allows for the manipulation of cellular assemblies.

=== Genetic alteration ===
Nanoparticles can also be used in conjunction with DNA to perform genetic alterations. These are frequently monitored through the use of fluorescent materials, allowing scientists to judge if these tagged proteins have successfully been transmitted—for example green fluorescent protein, or GFP. Nanoparticles are significantly less cytotoxic than currently used organic methods, providing a more efficient method of monitoring genetic alternations. They also do not degrade or bleach with time, as organic dyes do. Suspensions of nanoparticles with the same size and shapes (mono-dispersed) with functional groups attached to their surfaces can also electrostatically bind to DNA, protecting them from several types of degradation. Because the fluorescence of these nanoparticles does not degrade, cellular localization can be tracked without the use of additional tagging, with GFPs or other methods. The 'unpacking' of the DNA can be detected in live cells using luminescence resonance energy transfer (LRET) technology.

=== Medical implications ===
Small molecules in vivo have a short retention time, but the use of larger nanoparticles does not. These nanoparticles can be used to avoid immune response, which aids in the treatment of chronic diseases. It has been investigated as a potential cancer therapy and also has the potential to affect the understanding of genetic disorders. Nanoparticles also have the potential to aid in site-specific drug delivery by improving the amount of unmodified drug that is circulated within the system, which also decreases the necessary dosage frequency. The targeted nature of nanoparticles also means that non-targeted organs are much less likely to experience side effects of drugs intended for other areas.

=== Studying cell interactions ===
Cellular interactions occur at a microscopic level and cannot be easily observed even with the advanced microscopes available today. Due to difficulties observing reactions at the molecular level, indirect methods are used which greatly limits the scope of the understanding that can be gained by studying these processes essential to life. Advances in the material industry has evolved a new field known as nanobiotechnology, that uses nanoparticles to study interactions at the biomolecular level.

One area of research featuring nanobiotechnology is the extracellular matrices of cells (ECM). The ECM is primarily composed of interwoven fibers of collagen and elastin that have diameters ranging from 10 to 300 nm. In addition to holding the cell in place, the ECM has a variety of other functions including providing a point of attachment for the ECM of other cells and transmembrane receptors that are essential for life. Until recently it has been nearly impossible to study the physical forces that help cells maintain their functionality, but nanobiotechnology has given us the ability to learn more about these interactions. Using the unique properties of nanoparticles, it is possible to control how the nanoparticles adhere to certain patterns present in the ECM, and as a result can understand how changes in the ECM's shape can affect cell functionality.

Using nanobiotechnology to study the ECM allows scientists to investigate the binding interactions that occur between the ECM and its supporting environment. Investigators were able to study these interactions by utilizing tools such as optical tweezers, which have the ability to trap nano-scale objects with focused light. The tweezers can affect the binding of a substrate to the ECM by attempting to draw the substrate away from it. The light emitted from the tweezers was used to restrain ECM-coated microbeads, and the changes in the force exerted by the ECM onto the substrate were studied by modulating the effect of the optical tweezers. Experiments showed that the force exerted by the ECM on the substrate positively correlated with the force of the tweezers, which led to the subsequent discovery that the ECM and the transmembrane proteins are able to sense external forces, and can adapt to overcome these forces.

=== Nanotechnology crossing the blood–brain barrier ===
The blood–brain barrier (BBB) is composed of a system of capillaries that has an especially dense lining of endothelial cells which protects the central nervous system (CNS) against the diffusion of foreign substances into the cerebrospinal fluid. These harmful objects include microscopic bacteria, large hydrophobic molecules, certain hormones and neurotransmitters, and low-lipid-soluble molecules. The BBB prevents these harmful particles from entering the brain via tight junctions between endothelial cells and metabolic barriers. The thoroughness with which the BBB does its job makes it difficult to treat diseases of the brain such as cancer, Alzheimer's, and autism, because it is very difficult to transport drugs across the BBB. Currently, in order to deliver therapeutic molecules into the brain, doctors must use highly invasive techniques such as drilling directly into the brain, or sabotaging the integrity of the BBB through biochemical means. Due to their small size and large surface area, nanoparticles offer a promising solution for neurotherapeutics.

Nanotechnology is helpful in delivering drugs and other molecules across the blood–brain barrier (BBB). Nanoparticles allow drugs, or other foreign molecules, to efficiently cross the BBB by camouflaging themselves and tricking the brain into providing them with the ability to cross the BBB in a process called the Trojan Horse Method. Using nanotechnology is advantageous because only the engineered complex is necessary whereas in ordinary applications the active compound must carry out the reaction. This allows for maximum efficacy of the active drug. Also, the use of nanoparticles results in the attraction of proteins to the surfaces of cells, giving cell membranes a biological identity. They also use endogenous active transport where transferrin, an iron binding protein, is linked to rod-shaped semiconductor nanocrystals, in order to move across the BBB into the brain. This discovery is a promising development towards designing an efficient nanoparticle-based drug delivery system.

== See also ==
- Nanomedicine
- Nanobiotechnology
- Nanotechnology in fiction
- Heart nanotechnology
