= Aquasome =

Drug delivery system

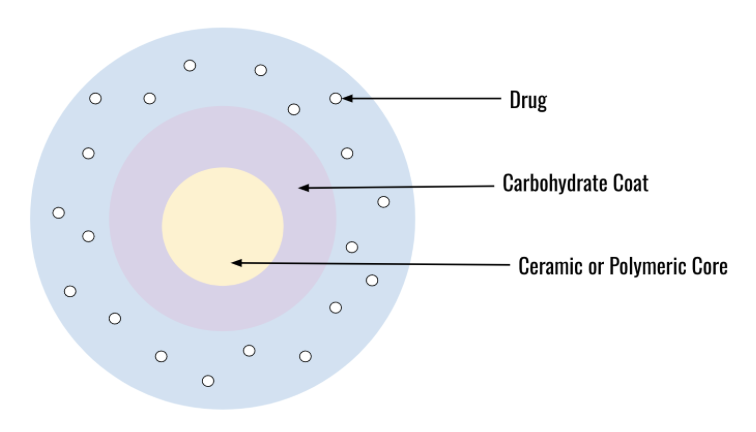
Aquasomes' structure highlighting its tri-layer formulation consisting of a ceramic core, carbohydrate coat, and the drug itself.

Aquasomes are self-assembling nanoparticle drug carrier systems composed of three layers: a ceramic core, an oligomer coat, and a loaded biochemically active molecule. Aquasomes are utilized for targeted drug delivery to achieve specific therapeutic effects, and are biocompatible, biodegradable, and stable. Due to their structure, aquasomes are capable of delivering several types of substrates, and can be used for applications such as delivery of antigens, insulin, and hemoglobin.

Aquasomes were first investigated by Kossovsky et al. in 1996 in experiments proposing their use in antigen delivery, drug delivery, and hemoglobin delivery systems. This initial research described aquasomes as self-assembling, with a novel surface modification process allowing the immobilization of drugs on the surface. The research was intended to address the molecular denaturation of polypeptide pharmaceuticals. Kossovsky et al. suggested that this system would be able to combat physical and chemical degradative agents affecting bioactive molecules while preserving the molecular structure of the drug.

Since this initial exploration, the understanding of the composition and applications of aquasomes has increased. After each individual layer is synthesized, aquasomes self-assemble into triple-layered particles. The tri-layer structure enables aquasomes to deliver and release poorly soluble drugs in a controlled manner. Delivery of these poorly soluble drugs within aquasomes increases their solubility, bioavailability, and stability. These drugs are adsorbed onto the surface of the aquasome, forming its third layer, which confers bioactive properties to the aquasome.

== Structure ==
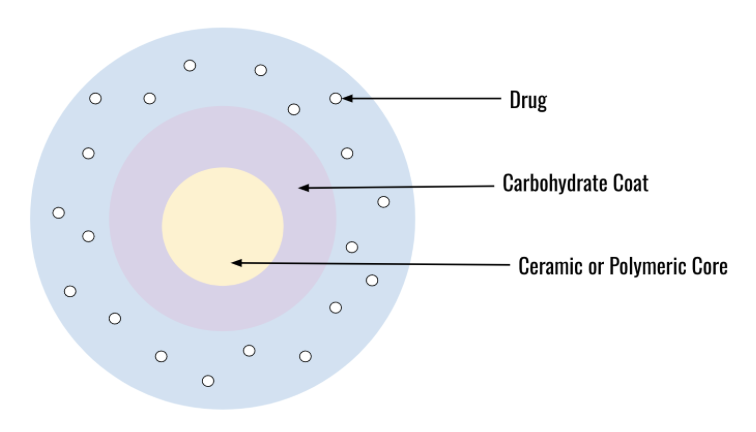
Aquasomes' structure highlighting its tri-layer formulation consisting of a ceramic core, carbohydrate coat, and the drug itself.

Aquasomes form a three-layered structure, made of a polyhydroxy oligomer coated core upon which the drug is loaded. The biochemically active molecules are able to interact with the coated core through different Van der Waal forces, entropic forces, and ionic and non-covalent bonds. The structure of aquasomes enables them to carry a variety of substrates (chemicals), facilitating applications such as protein and peptide delivery and protection, and the delivery of nucleic acids for gene therapy applications.

Aquasomes' solid core, made of ceramic or polymeric material, is attributed to the structural stability of the nanoparticle itself, and can result in improved solubility and biocompatibility of the drug. Different core designs have also been shown to affect the controlled release properties of the drug molecule. A commonly used core material is the ceramic calcium phosphate, which naturally occurs in the body. Hydroxyapatite, which is found in bone, is another commonly used core material. Hydroxyapatite cores have been shown to contribute to targeted delivery of encapsulated hepatitis B antigens intracellularly.

The second layer of aquasomes is the carbohydrate coat, onto which the drug is adsorbed. Due to carbohydrate's action as a dehydroprotectant, it has been shown to function as a natural stabilizer to preserve the conformation (shape) of soft drugs. The dehydroprotectant property of the carbohydrate coat also enables protection of the biochemically active molecule from dehydration and protein degradation.

The size of aquasomes ranges from 60 to 300 nanometers, hence their characterization as a nanoparticle drug carrier. The nanoscale of aquasomes gives them a high surface area to volume ratio. The smaller the core, the higher the surface area to volume ratio, which increases the drug loading capacity of the aquasome. Aquasomes possess water-like properties due to the presence of the carbohydrate coating, enabling them to protect and preserve fragile biological molecules. The size of aquasome particles increases as a function of the ratio between the concentration of the core to the coat due to the availability of free surface core particles for the coating material.

The self-assembly process of aquasomes into their tri-layer structure is achieved by non-covalent and ionic bonds, along with physicochemical properties of their components. Calcium phosphate nanoparticles are formed before the carbohydrate coat is adsorbed onto the surface of the core through electrostatic interactions. Layers are then added to the structure to achieve desired size, while crosslinked polymers aid in further stabilization. The sonication process during the reaction of disodium hydrogen phosphate and calcium chloride to prepare calcium phosphate impacts the self-assembly process of aquasomes by increasing surface free energy of the core prepared. This assembly process allows the design of aquasomes for specific drug delivery applications.

The structure of aquasomes can contribute to controlled drug release, drug stability, and intracellular targeting of the drug. Other commonly used nanoparticle drug delivery systems include niosomes, liposomes, and vesosomes, the compositions of which contribute to different properties of the resulting nanoparticle compared to aquasomes. Niosomes are composed of non-ionic surfactants and bilayer structures, allowing them to encapsulate hydrophilic and hydrophobic drugs. Liposomes are composed of phospholipids and a similar bilayer structure to niosomes, and can deliver toxic or poorly soluble drugs. Vesosomes have a core-shell structure similar to aquasomes, but contain a lipid bilayer core and a polymer shell, while aquasomes consist of a ceramic or polymeric core and a carbohydrate coat. Vesosomes are used for encapsulating imaging agents and aiding in imaging techniques such as MRI.

== Preparation ==
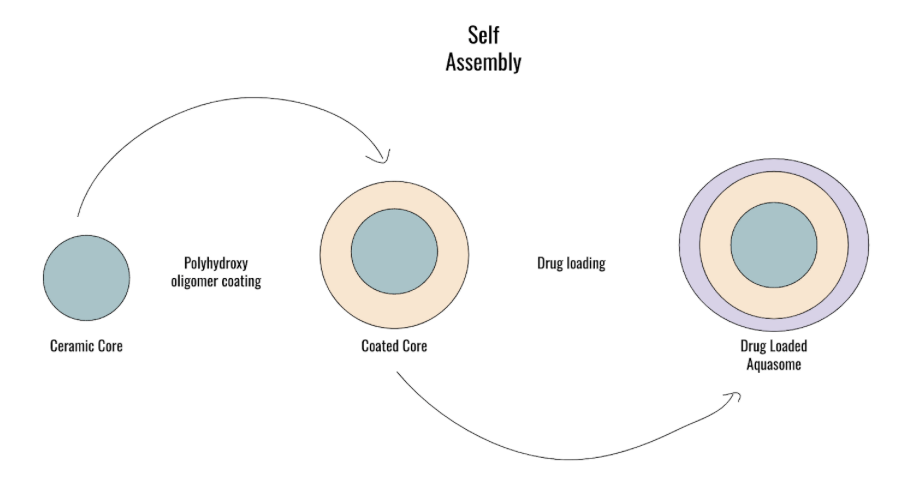
Preparation of aquasomes, which are synthesized layer-by-layer via self-assembly.

The three major units of aquasomes are fabricated together according to self-assembly, a thermodynamically driven process that organizes subunits of a system in a manner that results in the lowest Gibbs free energy available, known as ΔG. Self-assembly as a mixing process offers high accuracy and control over sizes on the nanometer scale, which is especially relevant for aquasomes, which exist on this size scale. The three layers of aquasomes can be synthesized differently using a variety of techniques depending on the intended functions or desired therapeutic effects. The general scheme of aquasome fabrication involves a sequential synthesis of a nanocrystalline core, followed by a polyhydroxy coating, and finished with integration of bioactive molecules. Throughout this process, several intermittent steps are included that involve selective filtering and purification to remove byproducts while isolating the desired products for further processing.

=== Core layer ===
The core of an aquasome can be made from either ceramic or polymeric materials. Examples of such polymers include acrylates and gelatin. However, because ceramic materials are more ordered due to their naturally occurring crystalline structure, they are more often preferred as the material type for the core. Some of the most common ceramic materials used in the formation of an aquasome core include tin oxide, calcium phosphate, and even diamond. Another characteristic that ceramic materials provide is enhanced binding of the carbohydrate layer due to the high surface energy present on the orderly surface. The binding affinity of the carbohydrate layer also reduces surface tension for its bond to the ceramic core. The first aquasomes fabricated with a nanocrystalline core using ceramic material are detailed in Kossovsky et al. in 1996. Calcium phosphate ceramic nanoparticles (brushite) were first prepared via the method of solution precipitation and sonication. Precipitation methods are the most common techniques employed when synthesizing the core of an aquasome as they offer control over the homogeneity and purity of the precipitated products, which are important design features in the core structure. Once the cores are prepared, they are separated by centrifugation and then washed to remove any salt byproducts from the solution precipitation process. Finally, the washed cores are passed through a Millipore filter to selectively isolate core particles of a certain size.

=== Carbohydrate layer ===
After synthesizing and purifying the core, the carbohydrate layer is added to its surface. Common coating materials are typically polyhydroxy oligomers such as cellobiose, citrate, lactose, and sucrose. This layer seems to be important for the properties of aquasomes, as it influences several drug characteristics including adsorption, molecular stability, and conformation (shape), and acts as a dehydroprotectant. The addition of the carbohydrate layer to the surface of the nanocrystalline core is commonly carried out by passive adsorption through incubation and sonication. Similar to the processing of the core, the carbohydrate layer is subjected to centrifugation, washing, and further sonification followed by heated air drying.

=== Bioactive molecule layer ===
Finally, the bioactive molecule of interest is loaded into the carbohydrate layer. This process typically occurs through either lyophilization or passive adsorption, and the fully functionalized aquasome is then characterized.

== Characterization ==
Solution precipitation as a core synthesis technique produces homogenous-sized nanoparticles, which can be advantageous in controlling specific physical properties such as surface tension and packing density of the atoms in a crystalline lattice structure. The most common methods of characterizing nanoparticle size distribution and morphology of the core in aquasomes include scanning electron microscopy (SEM) and transmission electron microscopy (TEM). In a study by Kommimeni et al. in 2012, researchers employed TEM to verify that the ceramic particles were spherical and also in the acceptable nano-range for aquasomes. The carbohydrate coating size can also be characterized using SEM and TEM, but Fourier-transform infrared spectroscopy (FTIR) is commonly utilized to check for the presence of the coat. In a study by Kommimeni et al. in 2020, FTIR was used to confirm the presence of the coating by analyzing the IR spectra bands that correspond to the functional groups of either the core or the sugar coat.

The bioactive drug loaded onto the aquasome can be characterized in a variety of ways depending on the molecular classification of the drug. In Kossovsky et al. in 1996, which studied the effect of insulin as the bioactive drug of interest, immunogold labeling was employed. Through this technique, the different binding efficiencies of carbohydrate coatings for insulin were able to be observed.

== Applications ==
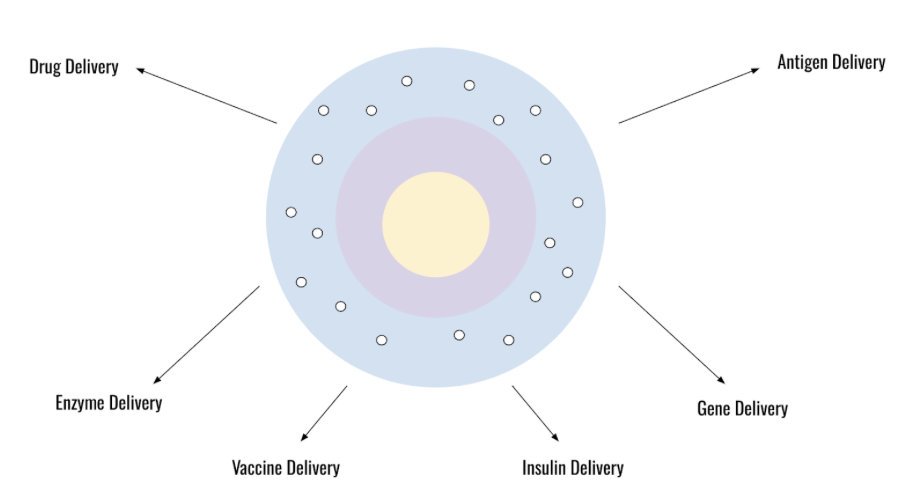
Outline of applications of aquasomes, comprising the delivery of several types of substrates

=== Drug delivery ===
The structure of aquasomes enables dual drug delivery, or the delivery of two drugs simultaneously. This practice aims to enhance the therapeutic efficiency and reduce the side effects of the drugs delivered. Such systems can be useful in treating patients suffering from multiple diseases. Challenges in dual drug delivery include independently controlling release rates of each of the drugs loaded in the system. In a 2019 study by Damera et al., aquasomes were used to deliver bovine serum albumin (BSA) in combination with one of three therapeutic drugs (Coumarin 153, Warfarin, and Ibuprofen), allowing release of a bioactive molecule and a hydrophobic drug simultaneously. Damera et al. suggested that dual drug delivery was enabled by the bioactive molecule layer of the aquasome being BSA. This BSA layer interacted with the hydrophobic therapeutic drugs, and the strength of the binding interactions was shown to affect the release behaviors of the drugs. Dual drug delivery with aquasomes thus shows promise for treatment of patients with coexisting diseases alongside hypoalbuminemia, as the albumin from BSA can treat the hypoalbuminemia while the additional drug treats the disease.

=== Hemoglobin delivery ===
Aquasomes have been explored as carriers for hemoglobin throughout the body. In a 2002 study by Khopade, Khopade, and Jain, aquasomes were used to act as red blood cell substitutes with hemoglobin attached to the oligomer surface. Aquasomes in this application demonstrated minimal toxicity while obtaining a hemoglobin content of 80%, supplying blood and oxygen in a manner similar to regular red blood cells. Hemoglobin aquasomes with spherical hydroxyapatite cores have been shown to retain oxygen-affinity and cooperativity for 30 days in rats in vivo, causing no red blood cell hemolysis or blood coagulation, demonstrating potential capability as effective oxygen transporters. Additionally, aquasomes protected hemoglobin from degradation while maintaining hemoglobin function. Future exploration of aquasomes as hemoglobin carriers may explore controlled release of the aquasomes themselves to mimic typical oxygen release properties to aid in biomedical applications that require specific targeting and delivery of hemoglobin.

=== Insulin delivery ===
Aquasomes with calcium phosphate ceramic cores may be useful for the pharmaceutical administration of substrates such as insulin where drug action is conformationally specific. In a 2000 study by Cherian et al., disaccharides such as trehalose were used to coat the core before insulin was loaded onto the coated cores via adsorption. Albino rats were used as test subjects to test these aquasome insulin formulations, and the efficiency of different carbohydrate coat molecules on the aquasome was explored. Pyridoxal-5-phosphate-coated particles were shown to lower blood glucose levels more efficiently when compared to trehalose- or cellobiose-coated particles, which may be due to their differences in structural stability. The use of these nanoparticles for the delivery of insulin in vivo in rabbits demonstrated that insulin-bearing aquasomes showed slower release and prolonged activity compared to standard insulin solution. Similar to their role in carrying hemoglobin, the carbohydrate layer of aquasomes may be responsible for the ability to protect insulin from degradation when injected subcutaneously as in the albino rats tested. Aquasomes were also shown to release insulin in controlled manners, mimicking the typical release of insulin from the pancreas.

== Limitations ==
A potential challenge of aquasome-based drug delivery could be toxicity due to burst release of drugs if poorly absorbed on the carbohydrate coat. Aquasomes can also be expensive to formulate, particularly due to their step-by-step synthesis. Careful attention is needed during aquasome production to tune the thickness of each layer, and leaching and aggregation may occur during prolonged storage of aquasomes. A physiological challenge aquasomes present is that upon their entry into the bloodstream, they may be taken up nonspecifically, leading to opsonization and phagocytic clearance by the immune system. To prevent this, aquasome surfaces can be coated with polyethylene glycol (PEG) to block opsonin binding through steric hindrance; however, the effect of PEGylation on aquasome drug release has not been sufficiently explored to enable clinical applications. Polymer degradation in different physiological environments can change the stability and drug loading of aquasomes over time, as their surface properties directly impact drug release. Aquasomes may also be challenging to scale up and prepare as it is difficult to ensure consistent formulation quality. More research is needed to demonstrate both the efficiency and safety of aquasomes in clinical use.

== Future ==
Further advances in aquasome research require additional investigation of their in vivo drug release and targeting. Applications such as delivery of dithranol for the treatment of psoriasis and oral delivery of bromelain for the treatment of inflammatory diseases such as cancer show promising results in vitro and ex vivo. However, such applications have been unexplored in vivo, limiting their clinical use. Applications using aquasomes as carriers of hemoglobin, vaccines, and insulin have been tested in vivo in small animal models such as rats, mice, and rabbits, but current literature lacks in vivo testing in more advanced animal models, preventing their use as treatments for human conditions. Aquasomes are promising drug delivery mechanisms due to their ability to stabilize and transport a variety of substrates while allowing for controlled drug release. Prior to expanding the clinical applications of aquasomes, the gap existing in current literature will need to be filled by further investigating immune clearance of aquasomes, exploring additional surface modifications such as PEGylation, and expanding in vivo drug testing.
