= Pepducin =

Pepducins are cell-penetrating peptides that act as intracellular modulators of signal transference from receptors to G proteins. Pepducins were first developed at the Tufts Medical Center laboratories of Dr. Athan Kuliopulos and Dr. Lidija Covic.

Pepducins employ lipidated fragments of intracellular G protein-coupled receptor loops to modulate GPCR action in targeted cell-signaling pathways. A pepducin molecule consists of a short peptide derived from a GPCR intracellular loop tethered to a hydrophobic moiety. This structure allows pepducin lipopeptides to anchor in the cell membrane lipid bilayer and target the GPCR/G protein interface via a unique intracellular allosteric mechanism. Pepducins for over 15 different GPCRs have been successfully produced, several of which have shown activity in preclinical in vivo models.

An anti-PAR4 pepducin extended bleeding time in mice and protected against systemic platelet activation and thrombosis.

A CXCR4 agonist pepducin mobilizes bone marrow hematopoietic cells.

A PAR1 pepducin, PZ-128, has successfully completed phase I clinical trials.
