= British Society for Nanomedicine =

- Founded: 2012
- Founders: Chair (Professor Steve Conlan and Vice Chair (Dr Tom McDonald)
- Type: Nanomedicine society
- Location: UK
- Region served: Nanomedicine
- Members: Over 600
- Website: http://www.britishsocietynanomedicine.org/

The British Society for Nanomedicine (BSNM) is the primary UK nanomedicine society. Members of the society are drawn from the general public, academia, industry, regulatory agencies and healthcare professionals. The society is a registered charity whose mission includes the direct explanation of the ongoing science and commercial developments to allow the public to understand and stay in touch with nanomedicine research as it impacts future global healthcare. The society is also actively involved in the organisation of multidisciplinary scientific meetings to encourage dissemination of the latest advances and foster collaboration.

== History ==
The Society was founded in 2012, in Liverpool at its inaugural meeting that was attended by over 70 scientists from different disciplines from around the globe. The motivation for creation of the society originated by the first Chair (Professor Andrew Owen) and Vice Chair (Professor Steve Rannard) of the board of trustees from the University of Liverpool, with support from colleagues at Swansea University (Professor Steve Conlan) and Herriot Watt University (Professor Vicki Stone). The inaugural meeting attracted delegates from around the world including active board members for the American Society for Nanomedicine (ASNM) and the European Foundation for Clinical Nanomedicine (CLINAM). Since then, the society has continued to grow and has Trustees from all four nations of the United Kingdom. The society has hosted annual meetings at Swansea University, the University of Strathclyde, Queen's University of Belfast, and the Francis Crick Institute in London.

== Publication ==
Prior to 2019, the British Society For Nanomedicine publishes a journal which promotes nanomedicine; The Journal of Interdisciplinary Nanomedicine (JOIN) is published by Wiley

Since 2020, the British Society of Nanomedicine has been working in partnership with the Journal of Precision Nanomedicine.
