= Nanosubmarine =

Nanosubmarines, or nanosubs, are synthetic microscopic devices that can navigate and perform specific tasks within the human body. Most of the self-propelled devices will be used to detect substances, decontaminate the environment, perform targeted drug delivery, conduct microsurgery and destroy malicious cells. Nanosubmarines use a variety of methods to navigate through the body; currently the preferred method uses the electrochemical properties of molecules. There have been multiple successful tests using this technology to heal mice with inflammatory bowel diseases. The general goal of nanosubmarines is to be able to produce a machine which can sense and respond autonomously, all while being fueled by its environment.

== Uses ==
The main purpose of a nanosubmarine is to navigate the body and perform a specific task. The most speculated task is the treatment and diagnosis of diseases from within the body. This is supported by the task of detecting substances, as most diseases cause a specific type of protein or other molecule to be made in abundance within the bloodstream. Another speculated task is microsurgery. With this technology, doctors will be able to perform surgery on specific locations from within the body. One example of this could be a treatment for cancer. A nanosubmarine could be built to detect specific cancer cells within the body; after locating the cells, the nanosub would be able to kill only the mutated cells and ignore healthy cells.

== Navigation ==
Navigation is one of the most difficult aspects to develop in nanosubmarines. The goal is to be able to travel throughout the bloodstream without getting stuck in even the smallest of capillaries. However, this is difficult because the smallest capillaries are 2 μm across (2.0 × 10^{−6}m); blood cells are about 7μm but they are easily pliable and can squeeze through the capillaries. Another challenge with navigation is the fact that physics restricts the amount of propulsion such a small device can output. The blood flow is simply too strong for any device even compete with the flow, therefore the nanosubmarine would have to be carried by the blood.

One form of propulsion nanosubmarines could use is electrochemical. One example of a motor is a nanorod which is platinum on one side and gold on the other. When submerged in hydrogen peroxide the platinum oxidizes the H_{2}O_{2} into 2H^{+} and O_{2}. This process occurs because platinum takes two electrons from the molecule. On the other side of the rod, the gold reduces hydrogen peroxide into water, in doing so an electron is pulled from the gold. This causes a steady electron flow from the platinum side of the rod towards the gold side. Since the rod is so small, Newton's third law of physics applies. For any action there is a reaction, when the electrons are pulled across the surface of the rod, so too is the rod pulled in the opposite direction.

== Scientific achievements ==
The first recorded success of a nanosubmarine was performed by a team of students led by Dan Peer from Tel Aviv University in Israel. This was a continuation to Peer's work at Harvard on nanosubmarines and targeted drug delivery. Tests have proven successful in delivering drugs to heal mice with ulcerative colitis. Tests will continue and the team plans to experiment on the human body soon.

== See also ==
- Fantastic Voyage, novel and movie based on the nanosubmarine theme
