= Nanoparticles for drug delivery to the brain =

Nanomedicine method of crossing the blood–brain barrier

Nanoparticles for drug delivery to the brain is a method for transporting drug molecules across the blood–brain barrier (BBB) using nanoparticles. These drugs cross the BBB and deliver pharmaceuticals to the brain for therapeutic treatment of neurological disorders. These disorders include Parkinson's disease, Alzheimer's disease, schizophrenia, depression, and brain tumors. Part of the difficulty in finding cures for these central nervous system (CNS) disorders is that there is yet no truly efficient delivery method for drugs to cross the BBB. Many antibiotics, antineoplastic agents and CNS-active drugs, especially neuropeptides, cross the BBB poorly or not at all on their own. With the aid of nanoparticle delivery systems, however, studies have shown that some drugs can now cross the BBB, and even exhibit lower toxicity and decrease adverse effects throughout the body. Toxicity is an important concept for pharmacology because high toxicity levels in the body could be detrimental to the patient by affecting other organs and disrupting their function. Further, the BBB is not the only physiological barrier for drug delivery to the brain. Other biological factors influence how drugs are transported throughout the body and how they target specific locations for action. Some of these pathophysiological factors include blood flow alterations, edema and increased intracranial pressure, metabolic perturbations, and altered gene expression and protein synthesis. Though there exist many obstacles that make developing a robust delivery system difficult, nanoparticles provide a promising mechanism for drug transport to the CNS.

== Background ==
The first successful delivery of a drug across the BBB occurred in 1995. The drug used was hexapeptide dalargin, an anti-nociceptive peptide that cannot cross the BBB alone. It was encapsulated in polysorbate 80 coated nanoparticles and intravenously injected. This was a huge breakthrough in the nanoparticle drug delivery field, and it helped advance research and development toward clinical trials of nanoparticle delivery systems. Nanoparticles range in size from 10 - 1000 nm (or 1 μm) and they can be made from natural or artificial polymers, lipids, dendrimers, and micelles. Most polymers used for nanoparticle drug delivery systems are natural, biocompatible, and biodegradable, which helps prevent contamination in the CNS. Several current methods for drug delivery to the brain include the use of liposomes, prodrugs, and carrier-mediated transporters. Many different delivery methods exist to transport these drugs into the body, such as peroral, intranasal, intravenous, and intracranial. For nanoparticles, most studies have shown increasing progression with intravenous delivery. Along with delivery and transport methods, there are several means of functionalizing, or activating, the nanoparticle carriers. These means include dissolving or absorbing a drug throughout the nanoparticle, encapsulating a drug inside the particle, or attaching a drug on the surface of the particle.

== Types of nanoparticles for CNS drug delivery ==
=== Lipid-based ===
Diagram of liposome showing a phospholipid bilayer surrounding an aqueous interior.

One type of nanoparticle involves use of liposomes as drug molecule carriers. The diagram on the left shows a standard liposome. It has a phospholipid bilayer separating the interior from the exterior of the cell.

Liposomes are composed of vesicular bilayers, lamellae, made of biocompatible and biodegradable lipids such as sphingomyelin, phosphatidylcholine, and glycerophospholipids. Cholesterol, a type of lipid, is also often incorporated in the lipid-nanoparticle formulation. Cholesterol can increase stability of a liposome and prevent leakage of a bilayer because its hydroxyl group can interact with the polar heads of the bilayer phospholipids. Liposomes have the potential to protect the drug from degradation, target sites for action, and reduce toxicity and adverse effects. Lipid nanoparticles can be manufactured by high pressure homogenization, a current method used to produce parenteral emulsions. This process can ultimately form a uniform dispersion of small droplets in a fluid substance by subdividing particles until the desired consistency is acquired. This manufacturing process is already scaled and in use in the food industry, which therefore makes it more appealing for researchers and for the drug delivery industry.

Liposomes can also be functionalized by attaching various ligands on the surface to enhance brain-targeted delivery.

=== Cationic liposomes ===
Another type of lipid-nanoparticle that can be used for drug delivery to the brain is a cationic liposome. These are lipid molecules that are positively charged. One example of cationic liposomes uses bolaamphiphiles, which contain hydrophilic groups surrounding a hydrophobic chain to strengthen the boundary of the nano-vesicle containing the drug. Bolaamphiphile nano-vesicles can cross the BBB, and they allow controlled release of the drug to target sites. Lipoplexes can also be formed from cationic liposomes and DNA solutions, to yield transfection agents. Cationic liposomes cross the BBB through adsorption mediated endocytosis followed by internalization in the endosomes of the endothelial cells. By transfection of endothelial cells through the use of lipoplexes, physical alterations in the cells could be made. These physical changes could potentially improve how some nanoparticle drug-carriers cross the BBB.

=== Solid lipid ===
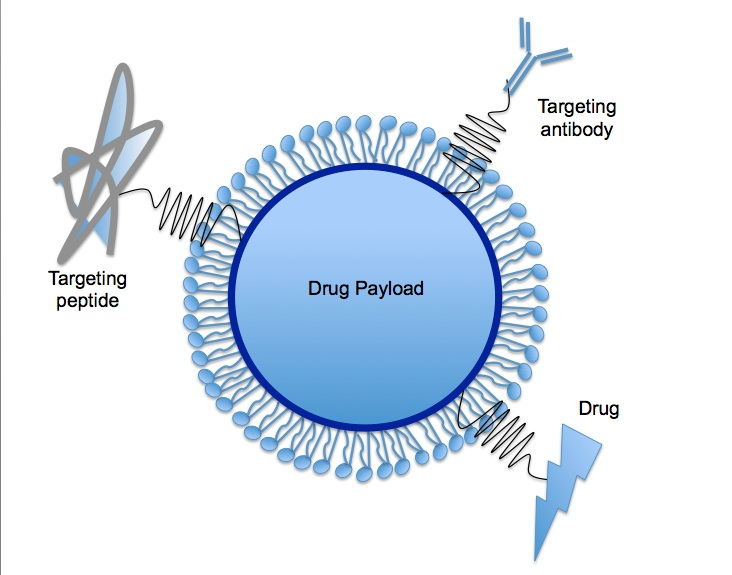
Diagram displays a solid lipid nanoparticle (SLN). There is only one phospholipid layer because the interior of the particle is solid. Molecules such as antibodies, targeting peptides, and drug molecules can be bound to the surface of the SLN.

Also, solid lipid nanoparticles (SLNs) are lipid nanoparticles with a solid interior as shown in the diagram on the right. SLNs can be made by replacing the liquid lipid oil used in the emulsion process with a solid lipid. In solid lipid nanoparticles, the drug molecules are dissolved in the particle's solid hydrophobic lipid core, this is called the drug payload, and it is surrounded by an aqueous solution. Many SLNs are developed from triglycerides, fatty acids, and waxes. High-pressure homogenization or micro-emulsification can be used for manufacturing. Further, functionalizing the surface of solid lipid nanoparticles with polyethylene glycol (PEG) can result in increased BBB permeability. Different colloidal carriers such as liposomes, polymeric nanoparticles, and emulsions have reduced stability, shelf life and encapsulation efficacy. Solid lipid nanoparticles are designed to overcome these shortcomings and have an excellent drug release and physical stability apart from targeted delivery of drugs.

=== Nanoemulsions ===
Another form for nanoparticle delivery systems is oil-in-water emulsions done on a nano-scale. This process uses common biocompatible oils such as triglycerides and fatty acids, and combines them with water and surface-coating surfactants. Oils rich in omega-3 fatty acids especially contain important factors that aid in penetrating the tight junctions of the BBB.

=== Polymer-based ===
Other nanoparticles are polymer-based, meaning they are made from a natural polymer such as polylactic acid (PLA), polyglycolide (PLG), polylactide-co-glycolide (PLGA), and polycyanoacrylate (PCA). Some studies have found that polymeric nanoparticles may provide better results for drug delivery relative to lipid-based nanoparticles because they may increase the stability of the drugs or proteins being transported. Polymeric nanoparticles may also contain beneficial controlled release mechanisms.

Polymer Branch

Nanoparticles made from natural polymers that are biodegradable have the abilities to target specific organs and tissues in the body, to carry DNA for gene therapy, and to deliver larger molecules such as proteins, peptides, and even genes. To manufacture these polymeric nanoparticles, the drug molecules are first dissolved and then encapsulated or attached to a polymer nanoparticle matrix. Three different structures can then be obtained from this process; nanoparticles, nanocapsules (in which the drug is encapsulated and surrounded by the polymer matrix), and nanospheres (in which the drug is dispersed throughout the polymeric matrix in a spherical form).

One of the most important traits for nanoparticle delivery systems is that they must be biodegradable on the scale of a few days. A few common polymer materials used for drug delivery studies are polybutyl cyanoacrylate (PBCA), poly(isohexyl cyanoacrylate) (PIHCA), polylactic acid (PLA), or polylactide-co-glycolide (PLGA). Human serum albumin (HSA) and chitosan are also materials of interest. PBCA undergoes degradation through enzymatic cleavage of its ester bond on the alkyl side chain to produce water-soluble byproducts. PBCA also proves to be the fastest biodegradable material, with studies showing 80% reduction after 24 hours post intravenous therapy injection. PIHCA, however, was recently found to display an even lower degradation rate, which in turn further decreases toxicity. PIHCA, due to this slight advantage, is currently undergoing phase III clinical trials for transporting the drug doxorubicin as a treatment for hepatocellular carcinomas.

Coating these polymeric nanoparticle devices with different surfactants can also aid BBB crossing and uptake in the brain. Surfactants such as polysorbate 80, 20, 40, 60, and poloxamer 188, demonstrated positive drug delivery through the blood–brain barrier, whereas other surfactants did not yield the same results. It has also been shown that functionalizing the surface of nanoparticles with polyethylene glycol (PEG), can induce the "stealth effect", allowing the drug-loaded nanoparticle to circulate throughout the body for prolonged periods of time. Further, the stealth effect, caused in part by the hydrophilic and flexible properties of the PEG chains, facilitates an increase in localizing the drug at target sites in tissues and organs.

== Mechanisms for delivery ==
=== Liposomes ===
A mechanism for liposome transport across the BBB is lipid-mediated free diffusion, a type of facilitated diffusion, or lipid-mediated endocytosis. There exist many lipoprotein receptors which bind lipoproteins to form complexes that in turn transport the liposome nano-delivery system across the BBB. Apolipoprotein E (apoE) is a protein that facilitates transport of lipids and cholesterol. ApoE constituents bind to nanoparticles, and then this complex binds to a low-density lipoprotein receptor (LDLR) in the BBB and allows transport to occur.

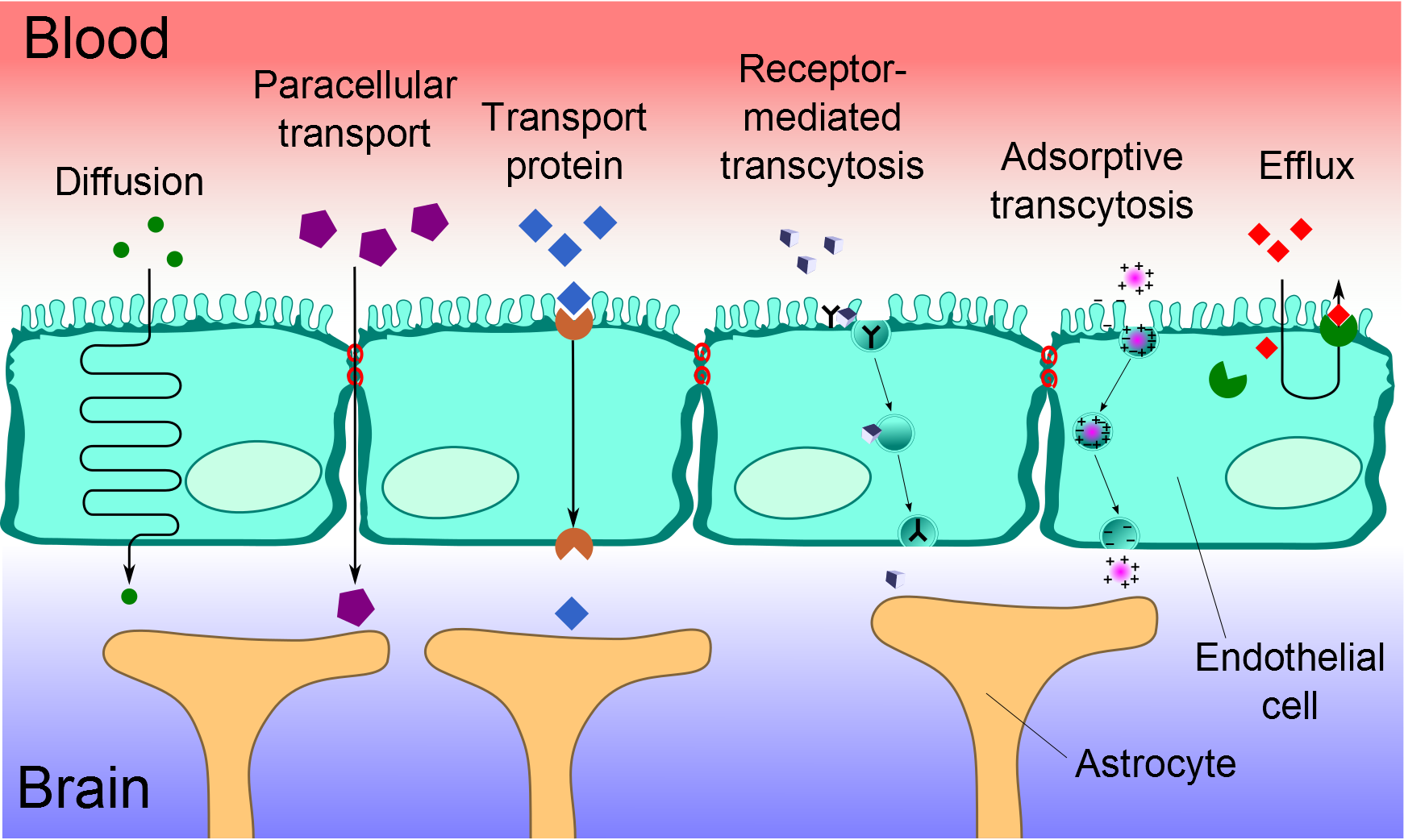
This diagram shows several ways in which transport across the BBB works. For nanoparticle delivery across the BBB, the most common mechanisms are receptor-mediated transcytosis and adsorptive transcytosis

=== Polymeric nanoparticles ===
The mechanism for the transport of polymer-based nanoparticles across the BBB has been characterized as receptor-mediated endocytosis by the brain capillary endothelial cells. Transcytosis then occurs to transport the nanoparticles across the tight junction of endothelial cells and into the brain. Surface coating nanoparticles with surfactants such as polysorbate 80 or poloxamer 188 was shown to increase uptake of the drug into the brain also. This mechanism also relies on certain receptors located on the luminal surface of endothelial cells of the BBB. Ligands coated on the nanoparticle's surface bind to specific receptors to cause a conformational change. Once bound to these receptors, transcytosis can commence, and this involves the formation of vesicles from the plasma membrane pinching off the nanoparticle system after internalization.

Additional receptors identified for receptor-mediated endocytosis of nanoparticle delivery systems are the scavenger receptor class B type I (SR-BI), LDL receptor (LRP1), transferrin receptor, and insulin receptor. As long as a receptor exists on the endothelial surface of the BBB, any ligand can be attached to the nanoparticle's surface to functionalize it so that it can bind and undergo endocytosis.

Another mechanism is adsorption mediated transcytosis, where electrostatic interactions are involved in mediating nanoparticle crossing of the BBB. Cationic nanoparticles (including cationic liposomes) are of interest for this mechanism, because their positive charges assist binding on the brain's endothelial cells. Using TAT-peptides, a cell-penetrating peptide, to functionalize the surface of cationic nanoparticles can further improve drug transport into the brain.

=== Magnetic and Magnetoelectric nanoparticles ===
In contrast to the above mechanisms, a delivery with magnetic fields does not strongly depend on the biochemistry of the brain. In this case, nanoparticles are literally pulled across the BBB via application of a magnetic field gradient. The nanoparticles can be pulled in as well as removed from the brain merely by controlling the direction of the gradient. For the approach to work, the nanoparticles must have a non-zero magnetic moment and have a diameter of less than 50 nm. Both magnetic and magnetoelectric nanoparticles (MENs) satisfy the requirements. However, it is only the MENs which display a non-zero magnetoelectric (ME) effect. Due to the ME effect, MENs can provide a direct access to local intrinsic electric fields at the nanoscale to enable a two-way communication with the neural network at the single-neuron level. MENs, proposed by the research group of Professor Sakhrat Khizroev at Florida International University (FIU), have been used for targeted drug delivery and externally controlled release across the BBB to treat HIV and brain tumors, as well as to wirelessly stimulate neurons deep in the brain for treatment of neurodegenerative diseases such as Parkinson's Disease and others.

== Toxicity ==
A study was performed to assess the toxicity effects of doxorubicin-loaded polymeric nanoparticle systems. It was found that doses up to 400 mg/kg of PBCA nanoparticles alone did not cause any toxic effects on the organism. These low toxicity effects can most likely be attributed to the controlled release and modified biodistribution of the drug due to the traits of the nanoparticle delivery system. Toxicity is a highly important factor and limit of drug delivery studies, and a major area of interest in research on nanoparticle delivery to the brain.

== Research ==
In the early 21st century, extensive research is occurring in the field of nanoparticle drug delivery systems to the brain. One of the common diseases being studied in neuroscience is Alzheimer's disease. Many studies have been done to show how nanoparticles can be used as a platform to deliver therapeutic drugs to these patients with the disease. A few Alzheimer's drugs that have been studied especially are rivastigmine, tacrine, quinoline, piperine, and curcumin. PBCA, chitosan, and PLGA nanoparticles were used as delivery systems for these drugs. Overall, the results from each drug injection with these nanoparticles showed remarkable improvements in the effects of the drug relative to non-nanoparticle delivery systems. This possibly suggests that nanoparticles could provide a promising solution to how these drugs could cross the BBB. One factor that still must be considered and accounted for is nanoparticle accumulation in the body. With long-term and frequent injections that are often required to treat chronic diseases such as Alzheimer's disease, polymeric nanoparticles could potentially build up in the body, causing undesirable effects. This area for concern would have to be further assessed to analyze these possible effects and to improve them.
