= Bolaamphiphile =

Hydrophobic chain molecules with hydrophilic end groups

In chemistry, bolaamphiphiles (also known as bolaform surfactants, bolaphiles, or alpha-omega-type surfactants) are amphiphilic molecules that have hydrophilic groups at both ends of a sufficiently long hydrophobic hydrocarbon chain. Compared to single-headed amphiphiles, the introduction of a second head-group generally induces a higher solubility in water, an increase in the critical micelle concentration (CMC), and a decrease in aggregation number. The aggregate morphologies of bolaamphiphiles include spheres, cylinders, disks, and vesicles. Bolaamphiphiles are also known to form helical structures that can form monolayer microtubular self-assemblies.
