= Heart nanotechnology =

Application of molecular-scale engineering to heart medicine

Heart nanotechnology is the "Engineering of functional systems at the molecular scale" ("Nanotechnology Research").

== Nanotechnology ==
Nanotechnology deals with structures and materials that are approximately one to one-hundred nanometers in length. At this microscopic level, quantum mechanics take place and are in effect, resulting in behaviors that would seem quite strange compared to what humans see with the naked eye (regular matter). Nanotechnology is used for a wide variety of fields of technology, ranging from energy to electronics to medicine. In the category of medicine, nanotechnology is still relatively new and has not yet been widely adopted by the field. It is possible that nanotechnology could be the new breakthrough of medicine and may eventually be the solution and cure for many of the health problems that humans encounter. Nanotechnology may lead to the cure for illnesses such as the common cold, diseases, and cancer. It is already starting to be used as a treatment for some serious health issues; more specifically it is being used to treat the heart and cancer.

== Nanomedicine ==
Nanotechnology in the field of medicine is more commonly referred to as nanomedicine. Nanomedicine that deals with helping the heart is really starting to take off and gain in popularity compared to most of the other fields that nanomedicine currently has to offer. There are several heart problems that nanotechnology has promising evidence of being effective in the treatment of heart disease in the near future.

=== Examples ===
It should hopefully be able to treat heart valves that are defective; and detect and treat arterial plaque in the heart ("Nanotechnology Made Clear"). Nanomedicine should be able to help heal the hearts of people that have already been victims of heart disease and heart attacks. On the other hand, it will also play a key role in finding people with a high risk of having heart disease, and will be able to help prevent heart attacks from happening in the first place. Nanotechnology of the heart is a lot less invasive than surgery because everything is occurring at a minuscule level in the body compared to relatively large tissues that are dealt with in surgery. With our technology today, heart surgeries are performed to treat the damaged heart tissue that resulted from a heart attack. This is a major surgery that usually takes a couple of months to recover from ("WebMD - Better Information. Better Health"). During this period, patients are extremely limited in the activities that they can do. This long recovery process is an inconvenience to the patients, and with the growth of medicine it most likely won't be very long before a more efficient method for treating heart attack patients will be developed and used. The method that is the frontrunner to replace major heart surgery is the use of nanotechnology. There are a couple alternate ways to heart surgery that nanotechnology will potentially be able to offer in the future.

== Alternatives to surgery ==
With people that have heart disease or that have suffered a heart attack, their hearts are often damaged and weakened. The more minor forms of heart failure do not require surgery and are often treated with medications ("WebMD - Better Information. Better Health"). The use of nanotechnology on treating damaged hearts will not replace these milder heart problems, but rather the more serious heart problems that currently require surgery or sometimes even heart transplants.

=== Heart repair ===
A group of engineers, doctors and materials scientists at MIT and Children's Hospital Boston have teamed together and are starting the movement of finding a way to use nanotechnology to strengthen the weakened heart tissue ("MIT - Massachusetts Institute of Technology"). The first method uses nanotechnology combined with tissue engineering, and gold nanowires are placed and woven into the damaged parts of the heart, essentially replacing the non-functioning or dead tissues.

=== Tissue regeneration ===
The other approach would potentially use minuscule nanoparticles that would travel through the body and find dying heart tissue. The nanoparticles would be carrying objects such as "stem cells, growth factors, drugs and other therapeutic compounds,". Then the nanoparticles would release the compounds and inject them into the damaged heart tissue. This would theoretically lead to the regeneration of the tissue.

== Heart repair difficulties ==
Being able to fix cardiac tissue that has been damaged from a heart attack or heart disease is a major challenge today in the field of tissue engineering because of the advanced fabrication techniques, expensive costs, and technical demands. Ensuring consistency between nanoparticles and organic cardiac tissue is a complex process, as variations can affect the heart's ability to function properly. Without proper consistent quality, processes such as pharmacokinetics may become compromised. Due to the difficult manner, many nanoparticle-based therapies are limited to research settings, and are not widely available in clinical practice.

=== Heart patches ===
There have been several successful examples of this with the use of a "stem-cell- based heart patch developed by Duke University researchers," ("Popular Science"). The biomaterials that make up the patch are usually made of either biological polymers like alginate or synthetic polymers such as polylactic acid ("Nature Nanotechnology"). These materials are good at organizing the cells into functioning tissues; however they act as insulators and are poor conductors of electricity, which is a major problem especially in the heart ("Nature Nanotechnology"). Since the electrical signals that are sent between calcium ions are what control when the cardiomyocytes of the heart contract, which makes the heart beat, the stem-cell heart patch is not very efficient and not as effective as doctors would like it to be ("Popular Science"). The results of the patch not being very conductive is that the cells are not able to attain a smooth, continuous beat throughout the entire tissue containing the stem cells. This results in the heart not functioning properly, which in turn could mean that more heart problems might arise due to the implanting of the stem cells.

=== Tissue scaffolds ===
Recently there have been some new developments in the field of nanotechnology that will be more efficient than the poorly conducting stem-cell-based patch ("Nature Nanotechnology"). Scientists and researchers found a way for these stem cell patches (also known as tissue scaffolds) to be conductive and therefore become exponentially more effective ("Nature Nanotechnology"). They found that by growing gold nanowires into and through the patches, they were able to greatly increase the electrical conductivity. The nanowires are thicker than the original scaffold and the cells are better organized as well. There is also an increase in production of the proteins needed for muscle calcium binding and contraction. The gold nanowires poke through the stem cell's scaffolding material, which strengthens the electrical communication between surrounding heart cells. Without the nanowires, the stem cell patches produced a minute current and the cells would only beat in small clusters at the stimulation origin. With the nanowires, the cells seem to contract together even when they are clustered far away from the source of stimulation. The use of gold nanowires with the stem cell heart patches is still a relatively new concept and it will probably be awhile before they will be used in humans. It is hoped that the nanowires will be tested in live animals in the near future.

=== Nanoparticles ===
Another way that nanotechnology will potentially be used to help fix damaged heart tissues is through the use of guided nanoparticle "missiles". These nanoparticles can cling to and attach to artery walls and secrete medicine at a slow rate ("MIT-Massachusetts Institute of Technology"). The particles, known as nanoburrs due to the fact that they are coated with little protein fragments that stick to and target certain proteins. The nanoburrs can be made to release the drug that is attached to them over the course of several days ("MIT-Massachusetts Institute of Technology"). They are unique compared to regular drugs because they can find the particular damaged tissue, attach to it, and release the drug payload that is attached to it ("MIT-Massachusetts Institute of Technology"). What happens is the nanoburrs are targeted to a certain structure, known as the basement membrane; this membrane lines the arterial walls and is only present if the area is damaged. Nanoburrs could be able to carry drugs that are effective in treating the heart, and also potentially carry stem cells to help regenerate the damaged heart tissue ("MIT-Massachusetts Institute of Technology").

==== Composition ====
The particles are made up of three different layers and are sixty nanometers in diameter ("MIT-Massachusetts Institute of Technology").The outer layer is a coating of polymer called PEG, and its job is to protect the drug from disintegrating while it is traveling through the body. The middle layer consists of a fatty substance and the inner core contains the actual drug along with a polymer chain, which controls the amount of time it will take before the drug is released ("MIT-Massachusetts Institute of Technology").

==== Research ====
In a study done on rats, the nanoparticles were injected directly into the rat's tail and they still were able to reach the desired target (the left carotid artery) at a rate that was twice the amount of the non-targeted nanoparticles ("MIT-Massachusetts Institute of Technology"). Because the particles can deliver drugs over a long period of time, and can be injected intravenously, the patients would not need to have multiple repeated injections, or invasive surgeries on the heart which would be a lot more convenient. The only downside to this is that the existing delivery approaches are invasive, requiring either a direct injection into the heart, catheter procedures, or surgical implants. There is no question, however, that the future of heart repairs and heart disease/attack prevention will definitely involve the use of nanotechnology in some way.

=== Polyketal nanoparticles ===
==== Composition ====
Polyketal nanoparticles are pH-sensitive, hydrophobic nanoparticles formulated from poly(1-4-phenyleneacetone dimethylene ketal). They are an acid-sensitive vehicle of drug delivery, specifically designed for targeting the environments of tumors, phagosomes, and inflammatory tissue. In such acidic environments, these nanoparticles undergo accelerated hydrolysis into low molecular weight hydrophilic compounds, consequently releasing their therapeutic contents at a faster rate. Unlike polyester-based nanoparticles, polyketal nanoparticles do not generate acidic degradation products following hydrolysis

==== Use in myocardial infarction ====
Post-myocardial infarction, inflammatory leukocytes invade the myocardium. Leukocytes contain high amounts of Nicotinamide adenine dinucleotide phosphate (NADPH) and Nox2. Nox2 and NADPH oxidase combine to act as a major source of cardiac superoxide production, which in excess can lead to myocyte hypertrophy, apoptosis, fibrosis, and increased matrix metalloproteinase-2 expression. In a mouse-model study by Somasuntharam et al. 2013, polyketal nanoparticles were used as a delivery vehicle for siRNA to target and inhibit Nox2 in the infarcted heart. Following intramyocardial injection in vivo, Nox2-siRNA nanoparticles prevented upregulation of Nox2-NADPH oxidase, and improved fractional shortening. When taken up by macrophages in the myocardium following a MI, the nanoparticles degraded in the acidic environment of the endosomes/phagosomes, releasing Nox2-specific siRNA into the cytoplasm.

Polyketal nanoparticles have also been used in the infarcted mouse heart to prevent ischemia-reperfusion injury caused by reactive oxygen species (ROS). Levels of the antioxidant Cu/Zn-superoxide dismutase (SOD1), which scavenges harmful ROS, decrease following MI. SOD1-enacapsulated polyketal nanoparticles are able to scavenge reperfusion-injury induced ROS. Furthermore, this treatment improved fractional shortening, suggesting the benefit of targeted delivery by polyketals. One of the key advantages of polyketal use is that they do not exacerbate the inflammatory response, even when administered at concentrations exceeding therapeutic limits. In contrast to commonly used poly(lactic-co-glycolic acid) (PLGA) nanoparticles, polyketal nanoparticle administration in mice instigates little recruitment of inflammatory cells. Additionally, intramuscular injection of polyketals into the leg of rats shows no significant increases in inflammatory cytokines such as IL-6, IL-1ß, TNF-α and IL-12.

== Additional reading ==
- Dvir T, Timko BP, Brigham MD, Naik SR, Karajanagi SS, Levy O, Jin H, Parker KK, Langer R, Kohane DS (25 September 2011). "Nanowired Three-dimensional Cardiac Patches". Nature Nanotechnology. 6 (11). Nature Publishing Group: 720–725. doi:10.1038/nnano.2011.160. PMC 3208725. PMID 21946708.
- "The Foresight Institute » Blog Archive » Nanotechnology for Heart Repair Advances". Nanotechnology - Foresight Institute. Archived from the original on 2017-07-04.
- "A Heart of Gold - MIT News Office". MIT - Massachusetts Institute of Technology.
- "Heart Patch Made of Gold Helps Cardiac Tissue Rebuild Itself". Popular Science. Archived from the original on 2024-07-18.
- "Nanotech Implant Monitors for Cancer and Now Heart Attacks, Too". Singularity Hub.
- "Nanotechnology Research Support at the National Heart, Lung, and Blood Institute". Circulation Research.
- "Nanotechnology vs Heart Disease". Nanotechnology Made Clear.
- "New 'nanoburrs' Could Help Fight Heart Disease". MIT - Massachusetts Institute of Technology.
- "Recovering After Heart Surgery". WebMD.
- "What Is Nanotechnology?". Nanotechnology Research.
