= Vesosome =

A vesosome is a multi-compartmental structure of lipidic nature used to deliver drugs. They can be considered multivesicular vesicles (MVV) and are, therefore, liposome-derived structures.

== Description ==
Vesosomes consist of one or more bilayers enclosing an aqueous core that contains unilamellar vesicles that function as internal compartments which contain the drug and which can vary in composition from each other. The external bilayer defines the lumen, limits emission of the vesicle contents, and protects the vesicle contents from degradation due to lipolytic enzymes. Its unique properties enable localized drug delivery to specific parts of the body and extend the duration of drug effect. Vesosomes are relatively straightforward to produce and they offer the flexibility to deliver multiple drugs within a single carrier, which has been shown to confer important advantages in chemotherapy. Internal vesicle diameters range from 20-500 nm and vesosome diameters range from about 0.1 micron to more than 1.0 micron.

== Historical background ==
Shortly after the first description of liposomes, by British haematologist Alec D Bangham in 1961 (published 1964), at the Babraham Institute, in Cambridge, scientists first started to contemplate the possibility of employing them as transportation systems in the blood stream. Since then, there have been many advances in this area, and as of 2008 there were 11 clinically approved liposomal drugs targeting a variety of pathological conditions and illnesses, including fungal infections, hepatitis A, influenza and certain cancers. Now, scientists plan to take full advantage of the 40 years of progress in liposome development to enhance this transportation system by employing vesosomes.

== Design and construction ==
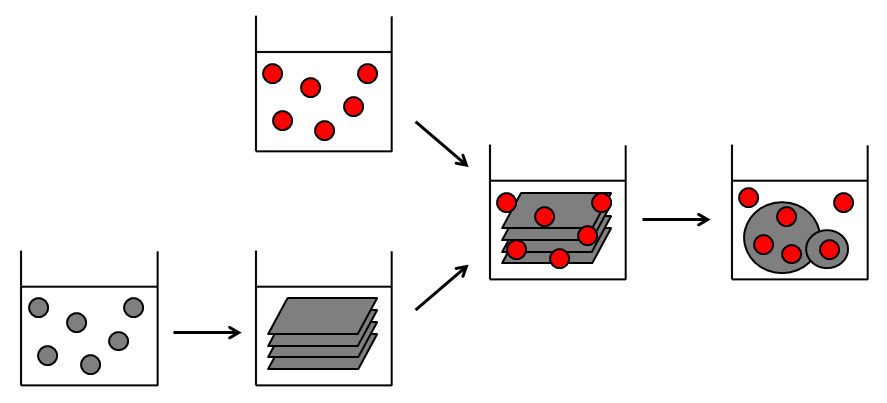
Schematic drawing of the steps followed during vesosome synthesis.

Vesosome multicompartment structure encapsulates unilamellar liposomes within a second bilayer. For this purpose, it is necessary to form bilayers that can be opened and closed at will, without disrupting the inner content. This is achieved by adding ethanol to a variety of saturated phospholipids in the gel phase, which drives interdigitation of phospholipids bilayers and subsequent fusion of small vesicles to form flat bilayer sheets. These are steady to removal of the residual ethanol until heated above the lipid chain melting temperature (T_{m}). The bilayers become flexible, and the sheets spontaneously close on themselves to form unilamellar vesicles. During the closure, the sheets can entrap whatever is around in suspension. By adding the vesicles aggregates including drug-loaded vesicles to the pelleted sheets before heating the mixture, encapsulation is carried out to form vesosomes.

Vesosome structure has taken advantage of the progress in liposome development as steric stabilization, pH loading of drugs (it is loaded by pH gradient), and intrinsic biocompatibility (it can be modified with a variety of agents, for example to specifically target a disease site, or promote adhesion or fusion).

== Applications ==
A wide of molecular structures can be encapsulated in vesosomal vesicles, such as proteins with complex three-dimensional structures or condensed DNA. The most common use is to fill the vesosome’s vesicles with certain drugs that are going to be delivered in a particular area. Due to the small size of the vesosome and its good protection of the inner vesicles, it can be used in various cases, doing different functions.

If suitable receptors are included in the outer lipid bilayer of vesosomes during their preparation, then they are able to locate to inflamed areas. Once in the inflamed area, such vesosomes will deliver an anti-inflammatory substance from its vesicles though a pH gradient. Vesosomes that localise to tumours have also been demonstrated. They can be used to create, in a positioned area, a different nano-environment (considering that vesosome size is about 50 - 200 nanometres) either by altering the pH or the concentration of a particular substance.
