= European Universities in Egypt =

Private university near Cairo, Egypt

- الجامعات الأوروبية في مصر
- Type: Private
- Established: 2021
- Founder: Mahmoud H. Abdel-Kader (Chairman)
- Location: R3, Next to Sports City, New Administrative Capital, Egypt; 30.040241, 31.707228
- Language: English
- Hosted Universities: The University of London (UoL) as an "awarding body" with academic direction from LSE, Goldsmiths, King's College London, and Laws Consortium; The University of Lancashire (UCLan); The University of East London (UEL; 2024-)
- Website: eue.edu.eg
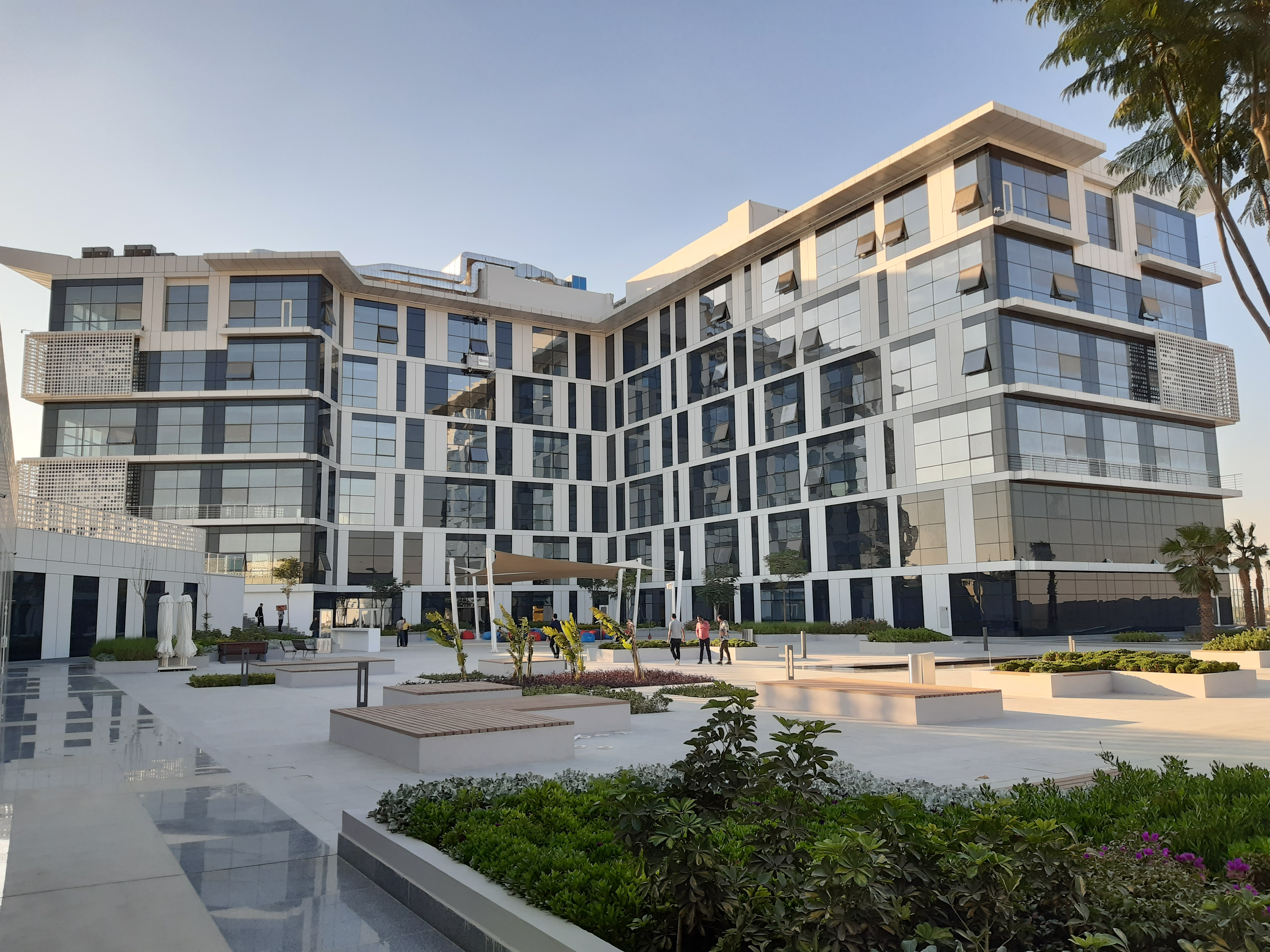

New Administrative Capital / 2nd New Cairo: Location of EUE Gate 1 = Coord 30.040241, 31.707228; Location of Sports City Stadium = Coord 30.04081, 31.68661.

The European Universities in Egypt (Arabic: الجامعات الأوروبية في مصر; Abbreviation: EUE) is a university institution located in the New Administrative Capital, Cairo Governorate, Egypt. Established under Law No. 162/2018 governing international branch campuses (IBCs) and university institutions in Egypt, it was formally inaugurated through Ministerial Decree No. 4200/2018 and Presidential Decree No. 86/2021.

The institution forms part of Egypt's Vision 2030 development plan, which emphasizes expanding educational infrastructure through new schools and universities. Founded by Mahmoud Hashem Abdel-Kader, EUE commenced operations in fall 2021, offering courses taught in English.

EUE hosts three British universities:

- The University of London (UoL): Provides programs under academic direction from its member institutions, including The London School of Economics and Political Sciences (LSE), Goldsmiths, King's College London, and a consortium of six UoL law schools.
- The University of Lancashire (UCLan; formerly University of Central Lancashire)
- The University of East London (UEL)

with programs at the undergraduate, graduate and professional levels. The institution provides study programs in Economics, Management, Business, Finance, Politics / Politics and International Relations, Computer Science, Psychology, Laws, Architecture, Pharmacy, and several fields of Engineering, including Aerospace Engineering. In 2024 the UEL branch was established, providing additional opportunities for studies on the EUE campus, including Marketing and HR Management, Fine Arts, Fashion Design, Graphic Design, Sports Therapy, Animation, and Physiotherapy.

EUE is a 'recognised teaching centre' of UoL and became an Affiliate of the European University Association (EUA) in 2022.

== Management / Governance ==
The chairman of the Board of Trustees is Mahmoud Hashem Abdel-Kader, former President of the German University in Cairo (GUC).

The members of the Board of Trustees include:

- Hossam M. Kamel (former President of Cairo University)
- Tamer Elkhorazaty (Dean of Architecture at the GUC)
- Yasser Mansour (former Chairman of the Architecture Department at Ain Shams University)
- Hassan Abdalla (Provost at the University of East London)

The current University and EUE Institutional Upper Management is:

- EUE-UoL Branch President: Reham Abdel-Kader (2025–)
- Acting EUE-UCLan Branch President / Dean: Abuelela Mohamed Abuelnaga (2023–)
- EUE-UEL Branch President: Nagwa Badr (2025–)
- EUE President: Mahmoud Hashem Abdel-Kader (2023–)
- EUE Vice President: Tarek M. Hashem (2022–)

Previous upper management positions were held by the following:

- 1st EUE-UCLan Branch President (2021–2023): Darrell D. Brooks (Senior Lecturer in Physiology at Preston UCLan Schools of Pharmacy and Medicine, School Lead for Quality Assurance)
- EUE-UoL Branch Presidents and Deans of LSE:
  - 2019–2022, Hala Abou-Ali (Full Professor of Economics at Cairo University, Vice President of Research and Postgraduate Studies at the Institute of National Planning)
  - 2023–2025: Sally Khalifa Isaac (Professor of Political Science at Cairo University)
- 1st UEL Branch President: Tarek Hassan Selim (2024–2025)
- 1st EUE President (2021–2022): Hilde Spahn-Langguth (former Director of Pharmacy at the de:Institut für medizinische und pharmazeutische Prüfungsfragen and [Full] Professor at the Martin Luther University Halle-Wittenberg, the GUC, and the Karl-Franzens-University of Graz, among others)
