= Micromixer =

In mechanics, a micromixer is a device based on mechanical microparts used to mix fluids. This device represents a key technology to fields such as Chemical industry, Pharmaceutical industry, Analytical chemistry, Biochemistry, and high-throughput synthesis, since it makes use of the miniaturization of the fluids associated in the mixing to reduce quantities involved in the chemical and/or biochemical processes. Typically, the characteristic channel sizes of micromixers range from a few micrometres to a few millimetres. They can be operated in the range from less than 1 ml/h to 10,000 L/h, making them suitable not only for research and development or analysis but also for chemical or biotechnological production

== Types and Technology ==
There are two types of micromixers: passive and active. Active mixers use an external energy source, either electric or magnetic, to mix the fluids. Drive fields for active mixers can be, for example, an ultrasonic field, a magnetic field, or an electric field.

=== Coriolis microreactor ===
The fluids to be mixed are pumped through microchannels on a rotating disc. The Coriolis effect that occurs here causes mixing.

=== Acoustic mixer ===
A piezoelectric oscillator transmits a high-frequency vibration to bubbles that are immobilised in cavities. Acoustic surface waves induce a micro-flow (‘acoustic streaming’) in the liquid medium, which drives the mixing process. For maximum mixing performance, the gas bubbles are excited to oscillate at their own resonance frequency.

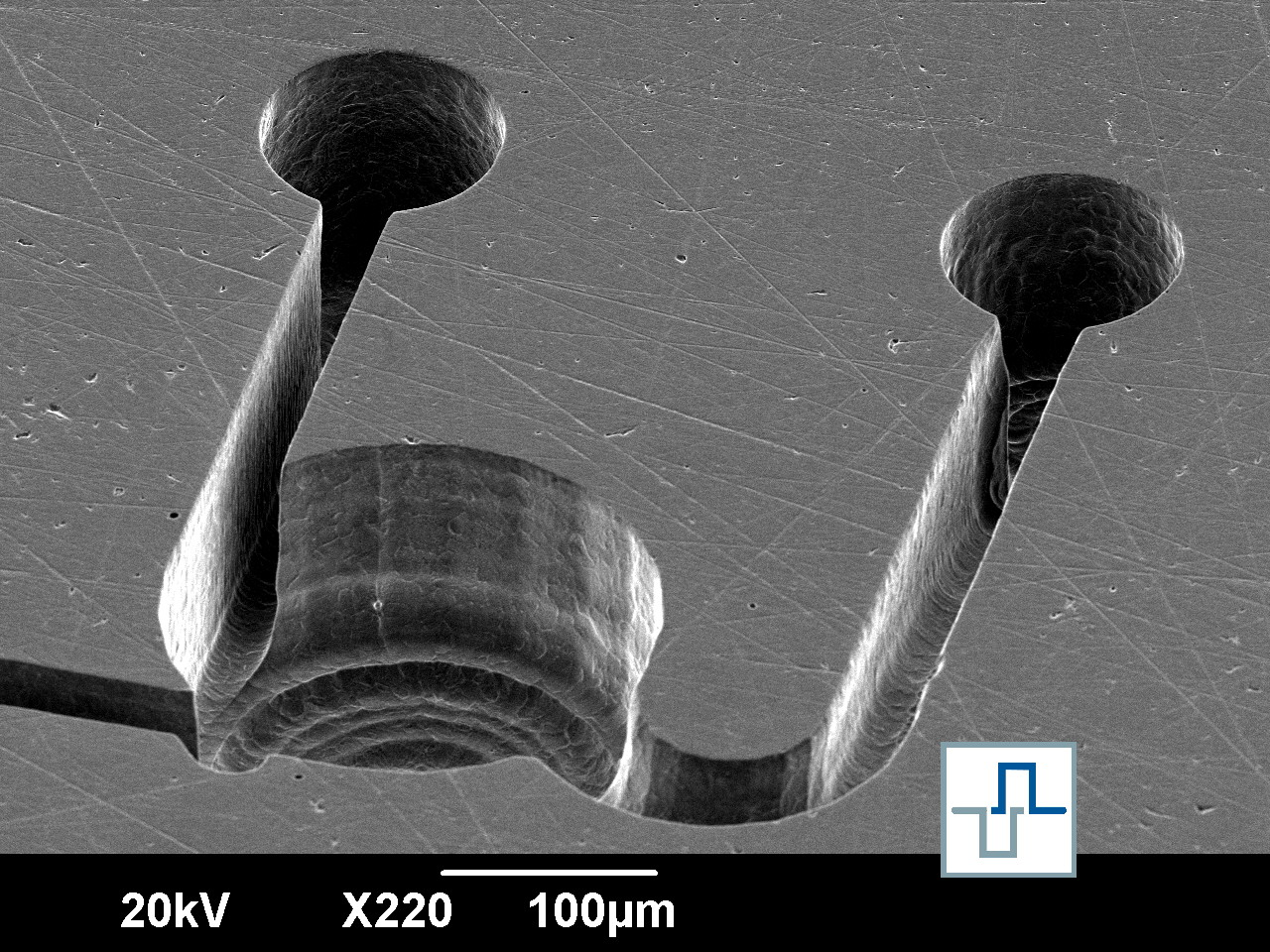
Micro-mixing structure of a cyclone mixer

Passive mixers have no power source and use pressure differences to guide the flow. They mix the fluids by reducing the distance between the media in contact and thereby accelerating diffusion. Passive mixers can be divided into the following types:

==== Lamination mixers ====
Lamination mixers are passive micro-mixers in which two or more liquid streams are combined to form parallel layers of liquid. The principle of lamination mixers is based on dividing the flows into several thin layers (‘laminae’), which greatly increases the contact area between the fluids and reduces the diffusion distance. If a flow is divided into $x$ sub-flows at each step, after $n$steps there will be $x^n$ layers with a layer thickness of $1/x^n$ of the original thickness of the flow. The characteristic structure can be twodimensional (e.g. Y-mixer) or threedimensional (e.g. caterpillar mixer). Lamination mixers are often used in applications where fast and controlled mixing at low flow rates is required.

A typiacall distinction is made between Y-mixers, multi-lamination mixers and split-and-recombine mixers. The simplest design of a lamination mixer is a Y-mixer with only one lamination step, in which two streams are fed side by side into a channel in a single lamination step.

==== Multilamination mixers ====
Multilamination mixers create an alternating and interdigital feed array by dividing the liquid streams into several thin liquid layers in one step and recombining them afterwards in a single channel. These mixers are sensitive to particles and contaminants due to their microstructured channels.

==== Split-and-recombine mixers ====
Split-and-recombine mixers work by repeatedly splitting and recombining the liquid streams. Since they consist of a single structured channel, these mixers can also be used successfully when precipitation occurs during the reaction or when fine slurries or suspensions are to be processed.
