= PAR1 (gene) =

PWAR1

Identifiers
- Aliases: PWAR1, D15S227E, PAR-1, PAR1, Prader Willi/Angelman region RNA 1
- External IDs: OMIM: 600161; GeneCards: PWAR1; OMA:PWAR1 - orthologs

Gene location (Human)
Chr.	Chromosome 15 (human)
Band	15q11.2	Start	25,135,642 bp
Band	15q11.2	End	25,138,055 bp
RNA expression pattern
Bgee	Human / Mouse (ortholog); Top expressed in: testicle; skeletal muscle tissue; muscle of leg; ganglionic eminence; primary visual cortex; muscle of thigh; right lobe of thyroid gland; prefrontal cortex; superior frontal gyrus; left lobe of thyroid gland / n/a; More reference expression data
BioGPS	n/a
Orthologs
Species	Human	Mouse
Entrez	145624	n/a
Ensembl	ENSG00000279050	n/a
UniProt	n a	n/a
RefSeq (mRNA)	n/a	n/a
RefSeq (protein)	n/a	n/a
Location (UCSC)	Chr 15: 25.14 – 25.14 Mb	n/a
PubMed search		n/a
- Wikidata
View/Edit Human

Prader-Willi/Angelman region-1, also known as PWAR1, is an exon of the lncRNA Small nucleolar RNA host gene 14 (SNHG14).
