= List of nanotechnology organizations =

This is a list of organizations involved in nanotechnology.

== Government ==
=== Brazil ===
- Brazilian Nanotechnology National Laboratory

=== China ===
- National Center for Nanoscience and Technology

=== Canada ===
- National Institute for Nanotechnology
- Waterloo Institute for Nanotechnology

=== European Union ===
- EU Seventh Framework Programme
- Action Plan for Nanosciences and Nanotechnologies 2005-2009

=== India ===
- MEMS, Microfluidics and Nanoelectronics Lab (BITS Pilani)
- Centre for Nanotechnology Research (Vellore Institute of Technology)
- Institute of Nano Science and Technology
- Indian Nano-Biologist Association
- Centre for Nano and Soft Matter Sciences
- Indian Association for the Cultivation of Science
- S. N. Bose National Centre for Basic Sciences
- National Chemical Laboratory
- Jawaharlal Nehru Centre for Advanced Scientific Research
- Saha Institute of Nuclear Physics
- Center For Converging Technologies (University of Rajasthan)
- Center For Nano Science and Engineering (Indian Institute of Science)
- Special Centre for Nano Sciences (Jawaharlal Nehru University)
- Centre for Nanoscience and Nanotechnology (Jamia Millia Islamia)
- Department of Nano Science and Technology (Tamil Nadu Agricultural University)
- Department of Nanotechnology (University of Kashmir)
- Parul University Micro-Nano Research & Development Center (Parul University)

=== Iran ===
- Iranian Nanotechnology Laboratory Network
- Iran Nanotechnology Initiative Council (INIC)

=== Ireland ===
- Collaborative Centre for Applied Nanotechnology

=== Russia ===
- Russian Nanotechnology Corporation

=== Sri Lanka ===
- Sri Lanka Institute of Nanotechnology

=== Thailand ===
- National Nanotechnology Center (NanoTec)

=== United States ===
- National Cancer Institute
- Alliance for Nanotechnology in Cancer
- National Institutes of Health
- Nanomedicine Roadmap Initiative
- American National Standards Institute Nanotechnology Panel (ANSI-NSP)
- NanoNed
- National Nanotechnology Initiative

=== Venezuela ===
- Instituto Zuliano de Investigaciones Tecnológicas (INZIT)

== Advocacy and information groups ==
- Indian Nano-Biologist Association
- Nanotechnology Industries Association (NIA)
- International Institute for Nanotechnology
- American Nano Society
- International Association of Nanotechnology
- Center for Biological and Environmental Nanotechnology, Rice University
- CMC Microsystems, Canada
- Foresight Institute (FI)
- Nano Science and Technology Institute (NSTI)
- Center for Responsible Nanotechnology
- Nanotechnology Industries
- Project On Emerging Nanotechnologies
- The Nanoethics Group
- American Chemistry Council Nanotechnology Panel
- Materials Research Society
- International Council on Nanotechnology (ICON) at Rice University
- Schau-Platz NANO, Munich, Germany
- National Nanomanufacturing Network (NNN)
- National Nanotechnology Manufacturing Center (NNMC)
- Institute of Occupational Medicine, Scotland, UK
- Safenano, Europe's Centre of Excellence on Nanotechnology Hazard and Risk
- Institute of Nanotechnology, Stirling, Scotland, UK
- Nanoworld, Russian Society of Scanning Probe Microscopy and Nanotechnology
- Nano Science and Technology Consortium (NSTC)
- Biological Applications of Nanotechnology (BANTech), University of Idaho
- Institute of Environmental Sciences and Technology (IEST)
- Intelligent Testing Strategies for Engineered Nanomaterials (ITS-NANO)
- Bangladesh Nano Society (BNS)

== Publishers ==
- American Chemical Society - Nano Letters
- Institute of Physics - Nanotechnology
- Encyclopedia of Nanoscience and Nanotechnology
- NanoTrends - A Journal of Nanotechnology and its Applications
- SPIE—International Society for Optics and Photonics - Journal of Nanophotonics

== Higher education and Research Institutes ==
See also Nanotechnology education for a listing of universities with nanotechnology degree programs.

=== North America ===
==== United States ====
- Biological Applications of Nanotechnology at University of Idaho
- Birck Nanotechnology Center at Purdue University
- California Institute of Nanotechnology
- California Nanosystems Institute at University of California, Los Angeles and University of California, Santa Barbara
- Center for Biological and Environmental Nanotechnology at Rice University
- Center for Hierarchical Manufacturing at University of Massachusetts Amherst
- Center for Integrative Nanotechnology Sciences at University of Arkansas at Little Rock
- Center for Nanostructure Characterization and Fabrication at the Georgia Institute of Technology
- Center for Nanotechnology in Society at Arizona State University
- Center for Nanotechnology in Society at University of California, Santa Barbara
- Center of Integrated Nanomechanical Systems and Berkeley Nanosciences and Nanoengineering Institute at University of California, Berkeley
- College of Nanoscale Science and Engineering at SUNY Albany
- Cornell NanoScale Science & Technology Facility (CNF) at Cornell University
- Institute for Micromanufacturing at Louisiana Tech University
- Institute for NanoBioTechnology at Johns Hopkins University
- Institute for Nanoscale and Quantum Scientific and Technological Advanced Research (nanoSTAR) at University of Virginia
- Institute for Soldier Nanotechnologies at MIT
- International Institute for Nanotechnology at Northwestern University
- Kavli Institute at Cornell for Nanoscale Science
- Kavli Institute for Bionano Science and Technology at Harvard University
- Kavli Nanoscience Institute at Caltech
- Nanofabrication Facility at Carnegie Mellon University
- Nanofabrication Facility at University of Delaware
- Nanoscale Science and Engineering Center at Columbia University
- NanoScience Technology Center at University of Central Florida
- Nanostructured Fluids and Particles at MIT
- Nano/Bio Interface Center at University of Pennsylvania
- Nebraska Center for Materials and Nanoscience University of Nebraska–Lincoln
- Network for Computational Nanotechnology at Purdue University hosting
- Petersen Institute of Nanoscience and Engineering (PINSE) at University of Pittsburgh Swanson School of Engineering
- Pittsburgh Quantum Institute
- Richard E Smalley Institute for Nanoscale Science and Technology at Rice University
- Textiles Nanotechnology Laboratory at Cornell University
- Davis Nano Group at Brigham Young University
- Vanderbilt Institute of Nanoscale Science and Engineering at Vanderbilt University
- Nano Institute of Utah at University of Utah
- Singh Center for Nanotechnology at University of Pennsylvania

==== Canada ====
- 4D LABS at Simon Fraser University
- Microsystems and Nanotechnology Research Group at The University of British Columbia
- Waterloo Institute for Nanotechnology at University of Waterloo
- BioNano Laboratory at University of Guelph
- Canadian Nano Society at nanosociety.ca

=== Europe ===
==== Denmark ====
- DTU Nanotech Department of Micro and Nanotechnology at Technical University of Denmark

==== European Union ====
- ePIXnet Nanostructuring Platform for Photonic Integration EU funded Framework 6 ePIXnet project

==== France ====
- Minatec
- CEA Léti
- Institut Néel
- Institut des nanotechnologies de Lyon
- Institut des Nanosciences de Paris

==== Germany ====
- Center for Applied Nanotechnology (CAN)
- Center for Nanotechnology at University of Münster
- Institute of Nanotechnology at Karlsruhe Institute of Technology
- Karlsruhe Nano Micro Facility at Karlsruhe Institute of Technology

==== Hungary ====
- Research Institute for Technical Physics and Materials Science at Hungarian Academy of Sciences

==== Ireland ====
- Collaborative Centre for Applied Nanotechnology

==== Netherlands ====
- Kavli Institute of Nanoscience at Delft University of Technology
- MESA+ Institute for Nanotechnology at University of Twente

==== Poland ====
- Center for Nanotechnology at Gdańsk University of Technology

==== Portugal ====
- International Iberian Nanotechnology Laboratory

==== Spain ====
- Catalan Institute of Nanoscience and Nanotechnology (ICN2)
- Molecular Nanotechnology Lab, University of Alicante

==== Switzerland ====
- Swiss Nanoscience Institute (SNI)

==== United Kingdom ====
- Bristol Centre for Functional Nanomaterials at University of Bristol
- London Centre for Nanotechnology
- James Watt Nanofabrication Centre at University of Glasgow
- Manufacturing Engineering Centre at Cardiff University
- Nanoscale Science & Nanotechnology Group at Newcastle University
- Southampton Nanofabrication Centre at University of Southampton

=== Asia ===
==== India ====
- Institute of Nano Science and Technology
- Deenbandhu Chhotu Ram University of Science and Technology
- Srinivas Institute of Technology
- Centre for Nano and Soft Matter Sciences
- Centre for Nano Science and Engineering, Indian Institute of Science
- Nano-Materials Research Lab, Tata Institute of Fundamental Research
- Center for Excellence in Nano-Electronics, Department of Electrical Engineering, IIT Bombay
- Nanoscale Research Facility, IIT Delhi
- Sophisticated Analytical Instrumentation Facility, DST Unit of Nanoscience, IIT Madras
- Thematic Unit of Excellence, IIT Kanpur
- K.B Chandrashekar Centre for Nanoscience and Technology, Anna University
- Department of Physics, Banaras Hindu University
- Department of Technology, Savitribai Phule Pune University
- Centre for Research in Nanoscience and Nanotechnology, University of Calcutta
- National Centre for Nanoscience and Nanotechnology, University of Madras
- School Of Material Science and Nanotechnology, Jadavpur University
- Nanotechnology Research Center, SRM University
- Centre for Nanotechnology Research, VIT University
- Amrita Centre for Nanoscience and Molecular Medicine, Cochin
- Centre for Nanoscience and Technology, Hyderabad
- Centre for Converging Technologies, University of Rajasthan
- National Institute of Pharmaceutical Education and Research
- Centre for Nanoscience and Nanotechnology, Panjab University, Chandigarh
- University Centre of Instrumentation and Microelectronics, Punjab University
- Nano Cellulose Research Lab, Central Institute for Research on Cotton Technology
- Centre for Nanoscience and Nanotechnology, Sathyabama University
- Post Graduate Department of Nanoscience and Technology, Mount Carmel College, Bengaluru.
- School of Nanoscience and Technology, Shivaji University, Kolhapur, 416004 Maharashtra

Centre for nanoscience and technology, pondicherry university

Centre for Research of Nanotechnology, University of Kashmir

==== Israel ====
- Tel Aviv University Center for Nanoscience and Nanotechnology

==== Japan ====
- Frontier Research Center, Tokyo Institute of Technology, Yokohama
- National Institute for Materials Science
  - International Center for Materials Nanoarchitectonics

==== Jordan ====
- Center for Nanotechnology Research and Development at Jordan University of Science and Technology

==== Pakistan ====
- Preston Institute of Nanoscience and Technology

==== Saudi Arabia ====
- Nanofabrication Core Lab at King Abdullah University of Science and Technology (KAUST)

==== South Korea ====
- Nano-Biomedicine & Imaging Laboratory at Chungju National University

==== Turkey ====
- Materials Science and Nanotechnology Program at Bilkent University
- National Nanotechnology Research Center
- Nanotechnology and Nanomedicine Program at Hacettepe University
- SUNUM Nanotechnology Research and Application Center at Sabanci University
- Nanoelectronics Research Center (Istanbul)

=== Oceania ===
==== Australia ====
- Flinders Institute for Nanoscale Science & Technology at Flinders University in South Australia
- The University of Sydney Nano Institute (Sydney Nano), at The University of Sydney in Sydney, NSW
- Australian Institute for Bioengineering and Nanotechnology at University of Queensland in Queensland
- Nanotechnology in Victoria Consortium joint investment with Monash University and Swinburne University of Technology

=== Africa ===
==== Egypt ====
- Naqaa Nanotechnology Network NNN, an affiliate of Naqaa foundation for Scientific Research, Technology and Development
- NanoTech Egypt
- Egypt Nanotechnology Center
- Center for Nanotechnology (CNT) at Nile University
- NBE Institute for Nanoscience and Informatics (INI) at Zewail City of Science and Technology
- Yousef Jameel Science and Technology Research Center at American University in Cairo

=== South America ===
==== Mexico ====
- Nanoscience and Nanotechnology Center at National Autonomous University of Mexico
- Nanotechnology Cluster of Nuevo Leon, AC

== Manufacturers ==
- Cerion Advanced Materials, United States
- CytoViva, inc., United States
- Genisphere, United States
- nanoComposix, United States
- Nanos scientificae, Slovenia
- nanoCLO (SMC-Pvt) Ltd., Pakistan
- Nano Group, Serbia

== See also ==
- List of nanotechnology topics
