= Harald Fuchs =

German experimental physicist (born 1951)

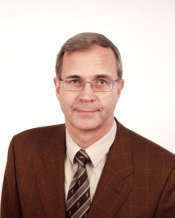
Harald Fuchs

Harald Fuchs (born April 15, 1951) is a Professor of Experimental Physics at the University of Münster, Germany, Scientific Director of the Center of Nanotechnology (CeNTech) in Münster, and co-director of the Institute of Nanotechnology (INT) in Karlsruhe. His research focuses on nanoscale science and nanotechnology, ranging from scanning probe microscopy to self organized nanostructure fabrication, and nano–bio systems. He has published more than 450 scientific articles in various journals as an author or co-author. He was awarded the Philip Morris Research Prize "Challenge Future" in 1994 and the Münsterland Innovation Prize in 2001. He is currently member of the German Academy of Natural Scientists Leopoldina, the German "National Academy of Science and Engineering" (acatech) as well as "The world academy of sciences" (TWAS). He holds two guest professorships in China. He is a cofounder of several nanotechnology companies and a member of the Editorial Boards in several international journals. In 2015 he received an Honorary Professorship at the Nanjing-Tech-University, China.

== Publications ==
- H. Fuchs, Rastersondenmikroskopie Bergmann-Schaefer, Lehrbuch der Experimentalphysik, Band 3: "Optik", 10. Aufl., S. 1133–1159, ISBN 3-11-017081-7, de Gruyter Verlag (2004)
- H. Fuchs, H. Hölscher, A. Schirmeisen, Scanning Probe Microscopy, Encyclopedia of Materials: Science and Technology, S. 1–12, ISBN 0-08-043152-6, Elsevier (2005)
- "Papers". Interface Physics Group.
