= Ahmed Gomaa Ahmed Radwan =

Professor of Engineering Technology

Professor Ahmed Gomaa Ahmed Radwan
- Citizenship: Egyptian
- Education: Nile University; Cairo University
- Occupations: Vice President for Research and Dean of Graduate Studies, Nile University, Egypt
- Title: A senior member of the Institute of Electrical and Electronics Engineers. A former center director of Nanoelectronics Integrated Systems Center of the Nile University, and Director of Technical Center for Career Development (TCCD), Cairo University. The Acting Head of Research & Sponsored Projects, Nile University, Egypt.

Ahmed Gomaa Ahmed Radwan is an Egyptian Professor of Engineering Technology & Applied Sciences at the Faculty of Engineering, Cairo University, Egypt. He is an elected fellow of African Academy of Sciences. He is also a senior member of the Institute of Electrical and Electronics Engineers. He was a former center director of Nanoelectronics Integrated Systems Center of the Nile University, and Director of Technical Center for Career Development (TCCD), Cairo University. He is currently the Acting Head of Research & Sponsored Projects, Nile University, Egypt.

== Education ==
Ahmed Gomaa Ahmed Radwan is an Egyptian professor of Engineering Technology and Applied Sciences. He currently serves as the Vice President for Research and Dean of Graduate Studies at the Nile University, Egypt. He is an elected fellow of the African Academy of Sciences and a senior member of the IEEE.

He was previously the Director of the Nanoelectronics Integrated Systems Center (NISC) at Nile University, Acting Dean of the School of Engineering & Applied Sciences at Nile University, and Director of the Technical Center for Career Development (TCCD) at the Cairo University.

He is the founder of the NILES International Conference and the Undergraduate Research Forum (UGRF).

Radwan has published over 480 indexed research papers and holds more than 11,000 citations with an h-index of 55 according to Scopus. He is a co-inventor of six U.S. patents and has authored or co-authored 13 books and 26 book chapters in internationally recognized publishers. He is considered one of the leading researchers in the fields of fractional-order systems and chaotic circuits and serves as an associate editor for four Scopus-indexed journals.

Among his major awards are the Egyptian State Encouragement Award (2012), the Abdul Hameed Shoman Award for Arab Researchers (2015), the Egyptian State Excellence Award (2018), the Scopus Award in Engineering and Technology (2019), and the Prof. Tarek Khalil Award for Distinguished Leadership (2022).

He has served on numerous scientific committees, including the Management Committee Observer for COST Action CA15225 (European Cooperation in Science and Technology), and has been selected as a member of the National Applied Research Council and the National Committee of Mathematics of ASRT-Egypt. He is also affiliated with the Egyptian Mathematical Society and the Fractional Calculus and Applications Group.

Prof. Radwan was named among the top 15 researchers in Egypt across all disciplines for the founding cohort of the Egyptian Young Academy of Sciences and was selected among 40 national experts by the Egyptian Center for the Advancement of Science, Technology and Innovation (ECASTI). He has managed research projects with total budgets exceeding US$1 million and supervised over 55 graduate theses, ten of which received best thesis awards.

In 2023, he was selected as the Africa Representative for the International Olympiad Committee in Engineering Sciences held in Greece. He has been listed among the top 2% of global scientists in both single-year and career-long categories in the annual Stanford University rankings for five consecutive years (2019–2024).

== Awards & Memberships ==
In 2003, he won the best Master thesis prize (2001-2004) at the Faculty of Engineering-Cairo University, Egypt.

In 2011, he won the 2nd best paper award in the international conference of microelectronics (ICM) in Tunis.

In 2012, he was awarded Senior IEEE membership.

In the same year, he was awarded state achievement award.

In 2013, he won the physical Sciences award in the 2013 International Publishing Competition by Misr El-Khair Institution.

In the same year, he won Cairo University achievements award.

In 2014, he was selected as a member in the first scientific council of the Egyptian Center for the Advancement of Science, Technology and Innovation (ECASTI).

In 2016, he won Prof. Mohamed Amin Lotfy award.

In 2018, he received the state first class medal of science and arts.

In 2019, he received the state excellence award and also won the Scopus award in engineering and technology.
