= Hogan Yu =

Chemist at Simon Fraser University

Hua-Zhong "Hogan" Yu
- 于化忠
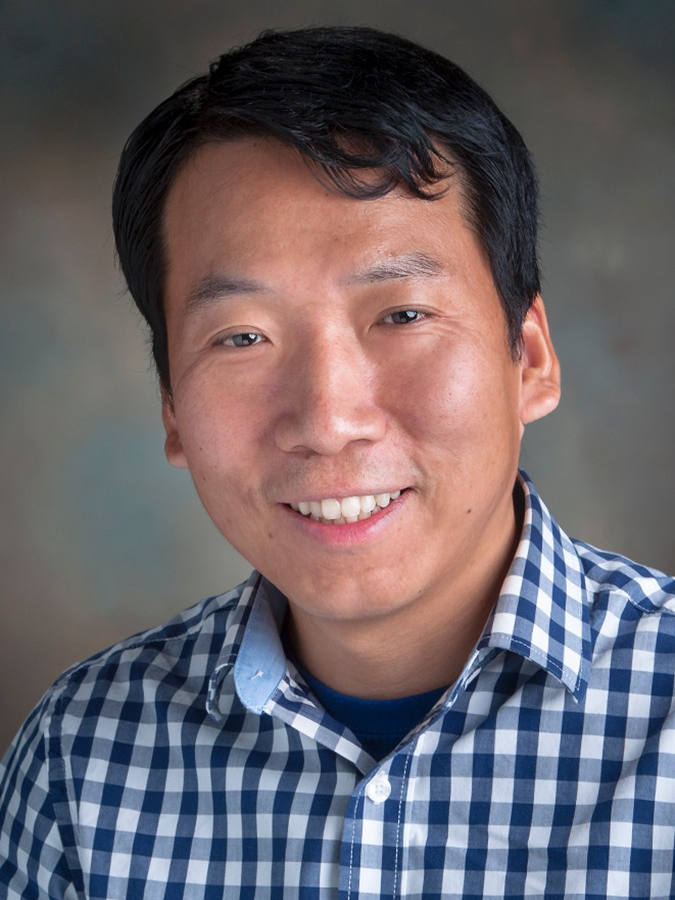
- Born: Shandong, China
- Education: Shandong University (B.Sc. & M.Sc.); Peking University (Ph.D.); California Institute of Technology (Postdoctoral Fellow); NRC Steacie Institute for Molecular Sciences (Visiting Fellow)
- Scientific career
- Institutions: Simon Fraser University (Professor Department of Chemistry)

Hua-Zhong "Hogan" Yu (于化忠) is presently a professor of materials and analytical chemistry at Simon Fraser University in metro Vancouver, Canada, where he leads a research laboratory working on Surfaces and Materials for Sensing. He is also an associate editor for Analyst, the journal for Analytical and Bioanalytical Sciences from the Royal Society of Chemistry in UK, and an adjunct professor in the College of Biomedical Engineering, Taiyuan University of Technology in Shanxi, China.

== Education ==
Born and raised in countryside China, Yu obtained his B.Sc. (Chemistry) from Shandong University in 1991 at an age of 20. He then received his joint M.Sc. from Shandong University and Dalian Institute of Chemical Physics (Chemical Physics) in 1994, and his Ph.D. from Peking University (Materials Chemistry, with Prof. Zhong-Fan Liu) in 1997. He did his postdoctoral research with Nobel Laureate Ahmed Zewail and electrochemist Fred Anson at the California Institute of Technology from 1997 to 1999.

== Career ==
After short stays at NRC and Acadia University, Yu was appointed to the Department of Chemistry at Simon Fraser University in 2001 as an assistant professor and promoted to a tenured full professor in 2009. He is now a principal investigator of the CFI-funded Centre for Nanomaterials and Microstructures (4D LABS) and an associate member of the Department of Molecular Biology and Biochemistry, both at SFU. Yu has been pursuing his cutting-edge research on solving fundamental problems that have direct impact on applied analytical science and technology. His innovation of adapting mobile electronics (office scanners, disc players, and now smartphones) for portable molecular analysis and his contribution to the de novo construction of ultrasensitive electronic biosensors for disease markers, lead to the possibility of performing many quantitative chemical analysis on-site and biomedical diagnostic tests at point-of-care settings. He has published more than 160 peer-reviewed articles and holds/filed 14 national/international patents.

== Awards and honors ==
- 1997 Alexander von Humboldt Fellowship
- 1999 National Laboratory Visiting Fellow (NSERC)
- 2004 Fred Beamish Award (CSC)
- 2008 JSPS Invitation Fellow
- 2011 W. Lash Miller Award (ECS Canadian Section)
- 2012 Tajima Prize (ISE)
- 2015 W.A.E. McBryde Medal (CSC)
- 2021 Fellow, Royal Society of Chemistry
