= Richard P. Appelbaum =

American sociologist

- Born: June 6, 1942 (age 84); Rochester, New York

Academic background
- Education: Columbia University (BA); Princeton University (MPA); University of Chicago (PhD)

Academic work
- Discipline: Sociology
- Institutions: University of California, Santa Barbara; Fielding Graduate University

Richard P. Appelbaum (born June 6, 1942) is an American sociologist. He is Distinguished Professor Emeritus and former MacArthur Foundation Chair in Global and International Studies and Sociology at the University of California, Santa Barbara, and currently a professor at Fielding Graduate University.

== Biography ==
Appelbaum was born on June 6, 1942, in Rochester, New York. He received his B.A. from Columbia University, M.P.A. from the Princeton School of Public and International Affairs, and PhD from the University of Chicago. His scholarship has focused on the globalization of business, and the sociology of work and labor. His most recent research has focused on innovation policy in China and the global supply-chain network.

Appelbaum held visiting professorships at the University of Manchester and the University of Hong Kong. He is the research group leader of the Center for Nanotechnology in Society.

He was the founding editor of the sociological journal Competition & Change and co-author of the textbook Introduction to Sociology, now in its 11th edition.

He was elected a fellow of the American Association for the Advancement of Science in 2011.
