= Albert van den Berg (physicist) =

Dutch physicist

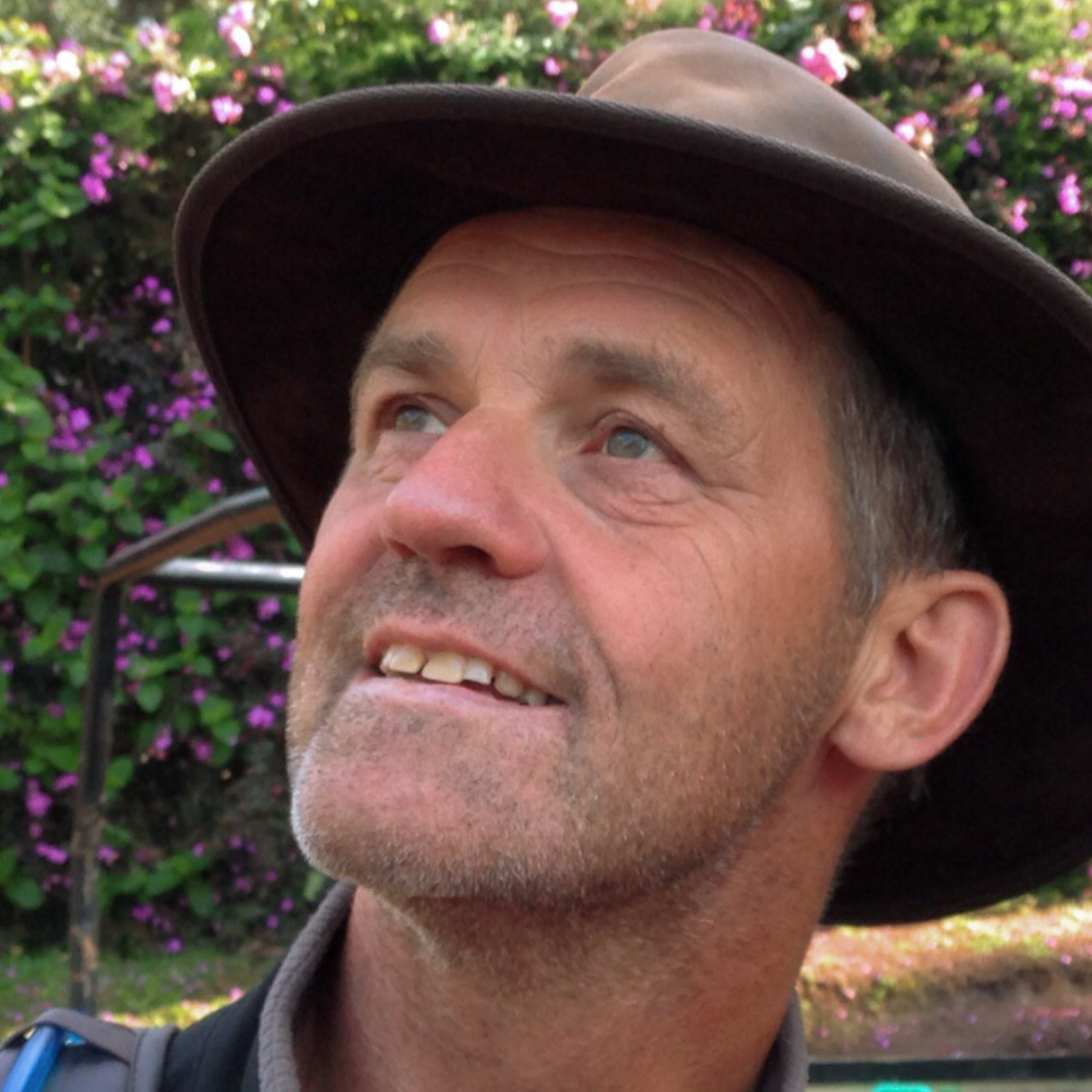
Albert van den Berg

Albert van den Berg (born 20 September 1957) is a Dutch physicist who works on nanotechnology-miniaturization in physics, chemistry, biology and biotechnology (nanofluidics, nanosensors, Lab on a chip (LOC), Organ on Chip (OoC)).

Van den Berg was born in Zaandam. In 1988 he earned his PhD at the University of Twente with a thesis on chemically modified ISFETs. Then until 1993 he worked at the Centre Suisse d'Electronique et de Microtechnique (CSEM) in Neuchâtel and the Institut de microtechnique (IMT) at the University of Neuchâtel. During this time he worked mainly on miniaturized chemical sensors. From 1993 to 1999 he was director of research for Micro Total Analysis Systems ($\mu$TAS, i.e. miniaturized systems for chemical analysis) and Miniaturized Chemical Systems (MiCS) at the Institute for Nanotechnology (MESA^{+}) at the University of Twente. In 1998 he had a part-time professorship and from 2000 a full professorship. In 2003 he became head of nanofluidics within the Dutch national nanotechnology program (NanoNed). Van den Berg has co-authored over 500 scientific publications (H=63) and over 10 patents. He is or has been involved with 10 spin-off companies. He is currently one of two co-directors of the MESA+ Institute at the University of Twente.

In 2002 he won the Simon Stevin Master Award of the Dutch Society of Science and Engineering. In 2009 he won the Spinoza Prize, the most prestigious Dutch science prize. As there was no fourth Spinoza Prize awarded in 2009, Van den Berg and his co-winners Michel Ferrari and Marten Scheffer asked the NWO to reward them the remaining prize money, which they would spend on a collaborative research effort. Their efforts culminated in a research paper on migraine published in PLOS ONE in 2013. The paper claimed that a critical tipping point of neurons started a migraine attack.

He is a member of the Royal Netherlands Academy of Arts and Sciences since 2008, and its council 2011–2016.

== Works ==
- Editor with R. Edwin Oosterbroek: Lab-on-a-chip: miniaturized systems for (bio)chemical analysis and synthesis, Elsevier 2003
- Editor with Helene Andersson: Lab on Chip for Cellomics. Micro - and Nanotechnologies for Life Science, Kluwer/Springer Verlag 2007
- Editor with Séverine Le Gac: Miniaturization and Mass Spectroscopy, Royal Society of Chemistry Publishing 2009
- Editor of conference volumes on Micro Total Analysis Systems, e.g. for the Workshops in 1994, 1998, 2000
