= Egypt Nanotechnology Center =

Egyptian research institute

- مركز مصر للنانو تكنولوجي
- Type: Research institute
- Established: July 2009
- Location: Sheikh Zayed City, Giza, Egypt
- Website: www.egnc.gov.eg

Egypt Nanotechnology Center (EGNC) (Arabic: مركز مصر للنانو تكنولوجي) is the joint result of partnership agreement between the Egyptian Ministry of Communications and Information Technology (Egypt) represented by Information Technology Industry Development Agency (ITIDA), Egyptian Ministry of Higher Education represented by Cairo University and Egyptian Ministry of Scientific Research represented by the Science and Technological Development Fund (SCID). It represents a state of art initiative launched by the Egyptian government in 2008 to support industrial research novelty.

== History ==
The center was proposed by the Egyptian government in 2008 and planning for the centre was based on a memorandum of understanding signed in September 2008 between the development agency, on behalf of the Egyptian Ministry of Communications and Information Technology (Egypt), SCID and IBM. The development of human capital started by sending 10 Egyptian researchers to gain industrial R&D experience in IBM’s research labs in Yorktown Heights and Zürich. During their post, they work in collaboration with IBM’s scientists on five main projects. Cairo University and Nile University were the founding academic partners of EGNC, and additional academic partners have been such as Mansoura University, and the Egypt-Japan University of Science and Technology. The center has 44 patents and published 25 researches in international scientific periodicals of nanotechnology applications in the period between 2009 and 2013

== Aims and Vision ==
This state of the art research center will contribute to the growth of the national economy through the development of human capital, the production of valuable intellectual property and the promotion of nanotechnology applications in all sectors that are relevant to the economic development of Egypt. The aim of the Center is to build and strengthen applied and industrial research and its infrastructure in the areas of greatest strategic value to Egypt's long-term competitiveness and development. The center also aims at making the Egyptian economy become among the top 10 in the world in terms of the relative growth resulting from the development and application of nanotechnology.

== Structure ==
The EGNC will include 28 specialized laboratories that equipped with the most up-to-date nanotechnology devices to help researchers work on the advanced Nano-science and Nanotechnology projects. The building include the largest clean room in Egypt with an area of 600 m2 which will be expanded to 2000 m2. This clean room will be open to the Egyptian public and private sector research activities. Another vital objective of the EGNC is to help researchers complete the projects they are working on within similar environment and help them translate their know-how into useful applications that can be used in different Industries.

== Partners ==
The EGNC is funded mainly by Egyptian Ministry of Communications and Information Technology (Egypt), Egyptian Ministry of Higher Education, Egyptian Ministry of Scientific Research, Information Technology Industry Development Agency (ITIDA) and Science and Technological Development Fund (SCID). The center also have many academic partners including Cairo University and Nile University, in addition to technology partners as IBM. The EGNC is also involved in joint projects with abroad universities and institutes as the Integrated Water Technologies (IWaTec) program with University of Duisburg-Essen.

== Current Research Focus ==
Research in EGNC focuses on solar energy, healthcare and drug design, water purification technologies, advanced software tools, simulation methods, multi-scale modeling techniques and algorithms. Current areas of focus for research include thin film silicon photovoltaics, energy recovery from concentrated photovoltaics for desalination, biosensors and computational modeling and simulation, Graphene Transparent Electrode and Nano-Biotechnology.

== See also ==
- List of nanotechnology organizations
