= INL =

INL may refer to:

== Organisations ==
- Bureau of International Narcotics and Law Enforcement Affairs, US
- Idaho National Laboratory
- Independent Newspapers, a New Zealand company
- Indian National League, a Muslim-based political party
- Institut des nanotechnologies de Lyon, a research institute in France
- Instituut voor Nederlandse Lexicologie ("Institute for Dutch Lexicology"), former name of the Instituut voor de Nederlandse Taal, part of the Dutch Language Union
- International Iberian Nanotechnology Laboratory

== Other ==
- Falls International Airport (IATA Code: INL), Minnesota, USA
- Inner nuclear layer, in the retina
- Integral nonlinearity, in electrical engineering, a measure of digital-to-analog converter or analog-to-digital converter accuracy
- Inter-National League, an ice hockey league
