= Martino Poggio =

Italian-American nanophysicist

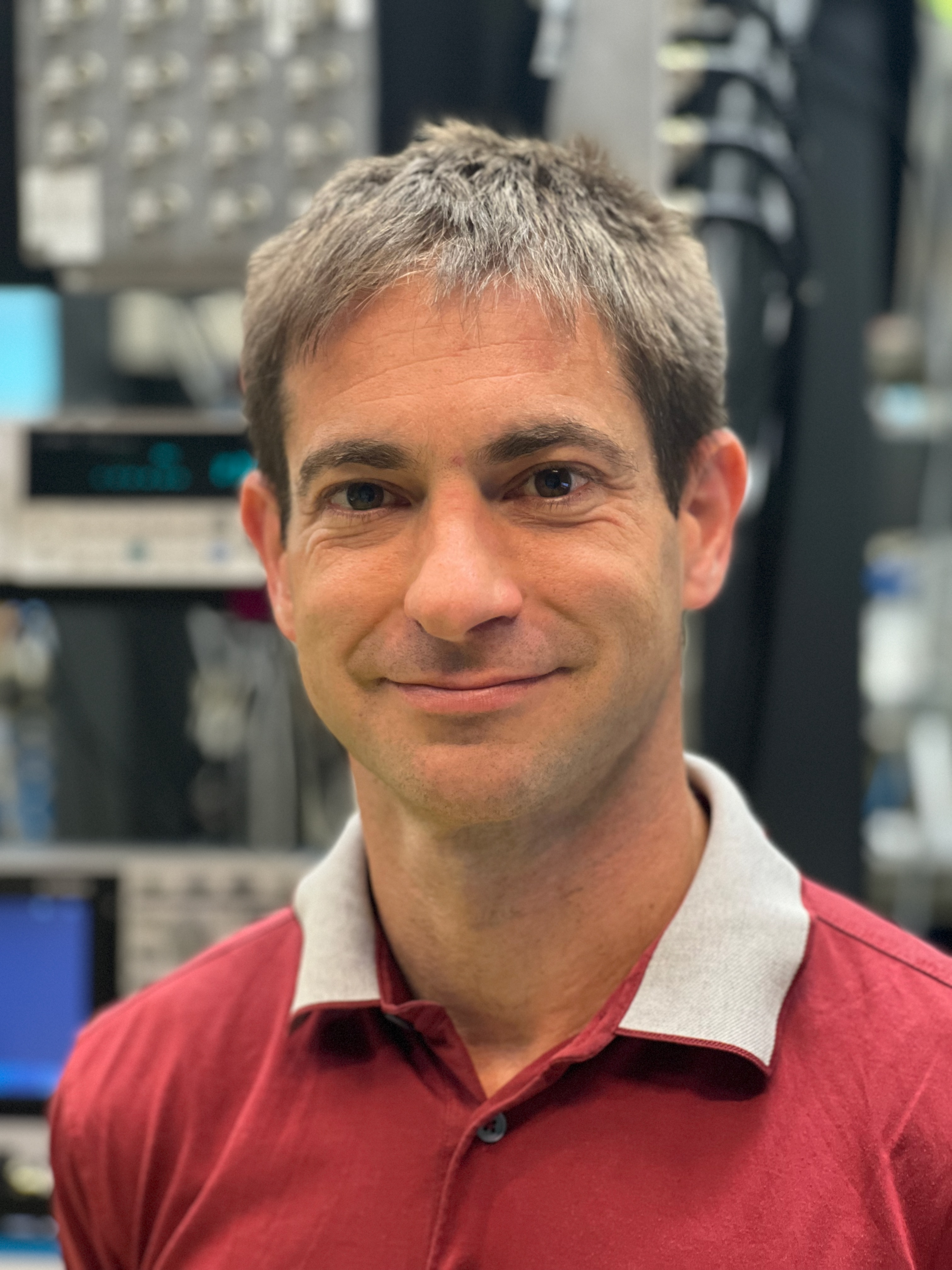
- Martino Poggio (2022)
- Scientific career
- Fields: Nanophysicist
- Workplaces: Harvard University, University of California, IBM Almaden Research Center, University of Basel, Swiss Nanoscience Institute

Martino Poggio (born 5 March 1978, in Tübingen) is an Italian-American nanophysicist who has been a professor of physics at the University of Basel (Switzerland) since 2009 and director of the Swiss Nanoscience Institute at the University of Basel since August 2022. In addition, he was head of the Department of Physics at the University of Basel from September 2019 to August 2021 and then deputy head until August 2023. From 2020 to 2022, Poggio also served as co-director of the National Center of Competence in Research (NCCR) QSIT.

== Early life and education ==
Martino Poggio, whose parents are from Italy, has both Italian and American citizenship. After graduating from the Roxbury Latin School, he completed his bachelor's in physics at Harvard University in 2000 and his PhD at the University of California, Santa Barbara in 2005. During his studies, he worked for David Awschalom in the field of ultrafast optics and semiconductor spintronics, completing his dissertation on the topic of "Spin Interactions Between Conduction Electrons and Local Moments in Semiconductor Quantum Wells".

== Career ==
After receiving his doctorate, he began work as a postdoctoral fellow at the Center for Probing the Nanoscale, a joint research centre of Stanford University and IBM. Until the end of 2008, he worked on high-sensitivity magnetic resonance force microscopy in Dan Rugar's laboratory at the IBM Almaden Research Center in San Jose, and he was appointed as an assistant professor in the Department of Physics at the University of Basel in summer of that year. Awarded an ERC Starting Grant in 2013, he was promoted by the university to associate professor in 2014 and full professor in 2020. Along with Roderick Lim, Poggio is one of two "Argovia" professors of nanosciences at the University of Basel, who are funded by the Swiss Nanoscience Institute (SNI). Since August 2022, Poggio has led the SNI as its director.

Poggio works primarily in the area of nanomechanics and its applications in sensor technology. In this context, nanomechanical sensors are used to take highly sensitive measurements of force, spin and charges on matter. The mechanical "top-down" devices that are traditionally found in the semiconductor industry are now joined by a new class of self-assembled "bottom-up" structures that offer huge potential for improving sensitivity.

== Awards ==
- 2013: European Research Council (ERC) Starting Grant
- 2010: Cozzarelli Prize for an outstanding PNAS publication

== Selected publications ==
A full list of publications can be found at Publications

- E. Marchiori, L. Ceccarelli, N. Rossi, G. Romagnoli, J. Herrmann, J.-C. Besse, S. Krinner, A. Wallraff, and M. Poggio (16 June 2022). "Magnetic imaging of superconducting qubit devices with scanning SQUID-on-tip". Applied Physics Letters. 121 (5). arXiv:2206.08163. Bibcode:2022ApPhL.121e2601M. doi:10.1063/5.0103597. S2CID 249712309.
- M. Wyss, K. Bagani, D. Jetter, E. Marchiori, A. Vervelaki, B. Gross, J. Ridderbos, S. Gliga, C. Schönenberger, and M. Poggio (1 March 2022). "Magnetic, thermal, and topographic imaging with a nanometer-scale SQUID-on-lever scanning probe". Physical Review Applied. 17 (3) 034002. arXiv:2109.06774. Bibcode:2022PhRvP..17c4002W. doi:10.1103/PhysRevApplied.17.034002. S2CID 237506894.
- E. Marchiori, L. Ceccarelli, N. Rossi, L. Lorenzelli, C. L. Degen, and M. Poggio (1 October 2021). "Nanoscale magnetic field imaging for 2D materials". Nature Reviews Physics. 4 (49): 49–60. arXiv:2103.10382. doi:10.1038/s42254-021-00380-9. hdl:20.500.11850/508924. S2CID 232269926.
- F. R. Braakman and M. Poggio (23 May 2019). "Force sensing with nanowire cantilevers". Nanotechnology. 30 (33). arXiv:1901.05861. Bibcode:2019Nanot..30G2001B. doi:10.1088/1361-6528/ab19cf. PMID 30991379. S2CID 88506163.
- N. Rossi, F. R. Braakman, D. Cadeddu, D. Vasyukov, G. Tütüncüoglu, A. Fontcuberta i Morral, and M. Poggio (17 October 2016). "Vectorial scanning force microscopy using a nanowire resonator" (PDF). Nature Nanotechnology. 12 (150): 150–155. doi:10.1038/nnano.2016.189. PMID 27749834. S2CID 26142567.
- P. Peddibhotla, F. Xue (薛飞), H. I. T. Hauge, S. Assali, E. P. A. M. Bakkers, and M. Poggio (23 July 2013). "Harnessing nuclear spin polarization fluctuations in a semiconductor nanowire". Nature Physics. 9 (631): 631–635. arXiv:1307.6007. Bibcode:2013NatPh...9..631P. doi:10.1038/nphys2731.
- M. Poggio and C. L. Degen (30 July 2010). "Force-detected nuclear magnetic resonance: recent advances and future challenges" (PDF). Nanotechnology. 21 (34). doi:10.1088/0957-4484/21/34/342001. PMID 20671365. S2CID 10028988.
