= David W. Frank =

Thespian, author and educator

- Born: David William Frank; October 22, 1949; Baltimore, Maryland, US
- Died: June 12, 2017 (aged 67); West Roxbury, Massachusetts, US
- Education: Friends School of Baltimore
- Occupation(s): Thespian, author, educator

David William Frank (October 22, 1949 – June 12, 2017) was an American thespian, author, and educator, who taught in Boston, Massachusetts for 34 years at the Roxbury Latin School.

== Early life and education ==
David Frank was born on October 22, 1949 and raised in Baltimore, Maryland. He attended the Friends School of Baltimore under the tutelage of Gerritt Blauvelt, whose teaching style Frank described as "a slight craziness under a veneer of respectability" that he himself would attempt to emulate many years later as a teacher at Roxbury Latin. Frank went on to attend Harvard University, where he graduated with a degree in English literature, and then to receive a master's degree in Teaching from Stanford University.

== Career ==
Shortly after graduation, Frank commenced a 40-year teaching career in English and theatre, the vast majority of which was spent at Roxbury Latin, the Boston-area high school that is the oldest in continuous existence in North America.

In his 34-year tenure at Roxbury Latin, Frank rose to the position of Director of Dramatics in addition to teaching English. He directed numerous plays, including "The Love of Three Oranges" in a joint production with the Winsor School.

He coached the Roxbury Latin chess team. Meanwhile, Frank continued his acting career in a limited capacity, being particularly fond of Shakespearean roles. He retired in 2012 to focus on his writing, becoming a published author later that year with the release of Monarch Man.

== Personal life ==
David Frank made his home in West Roxbury, Massachusetts, the neighborhood of Boston where he taught for many years. On June 12, 2017, Frank died of complications from cancer at the age of 67.

== Books ==
1. Monarch Man; Bradley Publishing, St. Louis, Missouri, 2012
2. The Summertime Stomp; Sarah Book Publishing, Harlingen, Texas, 2015
3. Vienna in Violet; Amphorae Publishing Group, Chicago, Illinois, 2015
4. Henry and Cleopatra; Create Space Publishing, 2017
