= Albert Hamilton Gordon =

American businessman (1901–2009)

- Born: July 21, 1901; Scituate, Massachusetts, U.S.
- Died: May 1, 2009 (aged 107); New York City, U.S.
- Education: Harvard University (BA, MBA)
- Occupation: Wall Street entrepreneur

Albert Hamilton Gordon (July 21, 1901 – May 1, 2009) was an American businessman who transformed the Wall Street firm of Kidder Peabody. He bought the firm in 1931 and remained its chairman until selling it to General Electric in 1986. He made cold calls to potential clients well into his 90s and continued to come to his office at Deltec Asset Management several times a week until he was over 100.

Past 100 years old he continued to serve as the chairman of the Trollope Society and as chairman of the Board of Trustees of the Roxbury Latin School, having graduated from there in 1919 and served as a Trustee since 1940; among his philanthropic activities were generous donations both to the School and to Harvard University. Unknown to many as a bibliophile, Gordon donated the only surviving copy of John Eliot's 1663 “Indian Bible” to Roxbury Latin School

In his later years, Gordon was still actively involved in investments and was bearish on U.S. stocks prior to the 2008 financial crisis.

Gordon died in New York City on May 1, 2009, at the age of 107. At the time of his death, he was the oldest living alumnus of The Roxbury Latin School, Harvard College and Harvard Business School. He was also a trustee of the New York Road Runners Club.
