= Akhlesh Lakhtakia =

Indian-American physicist and engineer

- Born: 1 July 1957 (age 69); Lucknow, India
- Citizenship: United States
- Education: IIT (BHU) (BTech, 1979; DSc, 2006); University of Utah (MS, 1981; PhD, 1983)
- Known for: Sculptured thin films; Complex-medium electromagnetics; Bioreplication
- Awards: SPIE Technical Achievement Award (2010); Walston Chubb Award for Innovation (2016)
- Scientific career
- Fields: Electromagnetics; Nanotechnology; Materials science
- Workplaces: Pennsylvania State University
- Notable students: Shanker Balasubramaniam

Akhlesh Lakhtakia (born 1 July 1957) is an Indian-American physicist and engineer who is Evan Pugh University Professor and Charles Godfrey Binder Professor of engineering science and mechanics at Pennsylvania State University.

His research focuses on electromagnetic fields in complex materials, including sculptured thin films, chiral materials, bianisotropy, and bioreplication, a form of engineered biomimicry applied to solar energy harvesting and pest eradication. His technique for visualization of latent fingerprints was featured in the NOVA documentary "Forensics on Trial".

== Education ==
Lakhtakia was born in Lucknow, India. He obtained a Bachelor of Technology degree in electronics engineering from the Indian Institute of Technology (BHU), Varanasi in 1979. He then earned Master of Science (1981) and Doctor of Philosophy (1983) degrees in electrical engineering from the University of Utah. He later received a Doctor of Science degree in electronics engineering from Banaras Hindu University in 2006.

== Academic career ==
Lakhtakia joined the faculty of Pennsylvania State University in 1983. He was elevated to the rank of Distinguished Professor of Engineering Science and Mechanics in January 2004. In 2006, he became the Charles Godfrey Binder (Endowed) Professor of Engineering Science and Mechanics. In 2018, he was named Evan Pugh University Professor, the highest academic rank at Penn State.

He was the first editor-in-chief (2007–2013) of the Journal of Nanophotonics published by SPIE.

Lakhtakia has held visiting positions at several institutions, including the University of Glasgow (1995), University of Dortmund (1997), Stanford University (1998), Tsukuba University (1999), and Imperial College London (2004–2007). He served as Honorary International Chair Professor at National Taipei University of Technology from 2020 to 2023.

== Honors and awards ==
Lakhtakia headed the IEEE EMC Technical Committee on Nonsinusoidal Fields from 1992 to 1994. He has served as an international lecturer for the International Commission for Optics, SPIE, and the Optical Society of America.

He received the PSES Outstanding Research Award in 1996, the PSES Outstanding Advising Award and the Faculty Scholar Medal in Engineering in 2005, and the PSES Premier Research Award in 2008. Nanotech Briefs recognized him in 2006 with a Nano 50 Award for Innovation. The University of Utah named him a Distinguished Alumnus in 2007, and the Indian Institute of Technology (BHU), Varanasi did likewise in 2014. He was named the winner of the SPIE Technical Achievement Award for 2010. He received the PSEAS Outstanding Teaching Award in 2016 and the Walston Chubb Award for Innovation from Sigma Xi in 2016 for conceptualizing and developing sculptured thin films.

Lakhtakia is a Fellow of the Optical Society of America (1992), SPIE (1996), the Institute of Physics (UK, 1996), the American Association for the Advancement of Science (2009), the American Physical Society (2012), the Institute of Electrical and Electronics Engineers (2016), the Royal Society of Chemistry (UK, 2016), and the Royal Society of Arts (UK, 2017).

== Selected books ==
- Time-Harmonic Fields in Chiral Media (1989)
- Beltrami Fields in Chiral Media (1994)
- Models and Modelers of Hydrogen (1996)
- Electromagnetic Fields in Unconventional Materials and Structures (2000)
- The Design of Innovation (2002)
- Sculptured Thin Films: Nanoengineered Morphology and Optics (2005)
- Nanotechnology: A Crash Course (2010)
- Electromagnetic Surface Waves: A Modern Perspective (2013)
- Engineered Biomimicry (2013)
- Modern Analytical Electromagnetic Homogenization (2015)
- Infinite-Space Dyadic Green Functions in Electromagnetism (2018)
- Electromagnetic Anisotropy and Bianisotropy: A Field Guide (2nd ed., 2019)
- The Transfer-Matrix Method in Electromagnetics and Optics (2020)
