= Roxbury Latin School =

School in West Roxbury, Massachusetts, US

Location
- 101 Saint Theresa Avenue; West Roxbury, Massachusetts 02132; United States; 42°16′32″N 71°9′27″W

Information
- Type: Private, boys, day, college-prep
- Motto: Mortui Vivos Docent (The dead teach the living)
- Established: 1645; 381 years ago
- Sister school: Winsor School
- Headmaster: Sam Schaffer
- Faculty: 83
- Grades: 7–12
- Gender: Boys
- Enrollment: 310 students (2024–25)
- Average class size: 12
- Student to teacher ratio: 6:1
- Campus size: 120 acres (49 ha)
- Campus type: Urban
- Colors: Jewel red, white, sable black
- Athletics: 10 sports 32 teams
- Athletics conference: ISL
- Mascot: Fox
- Rivals: Noble and Greenough School; Belmont Hill School
- Tuition: $40,600 (2024–25)
- Website: roxburylatin.org

The Roxbury Latin School (informally known as RL) is a private, college-preparatory, all-boys day school located in West Roxbury, Boston, Massachusetts. Founded in 1645 by Puritan missionary John Eliot, Roxbury Latin bills itself as the oldest boys' school in North America and the oldest school in continuous existence in North America.

Roxbury Latin enrolls about 300 boys from the seventh through twelfth grades. The school has an endowment of $212 million (as of June 2024). 38% of students are on financial aid and 100% of admitted students' demonstrated financial need was met in 2022. In addition, the school has a policy of charging frontline tuition that is "about 65% of that of other Boston-area independent schools." Tuition for the 2025–26 academic year is $42,200.

== History ==
=== Early years ===
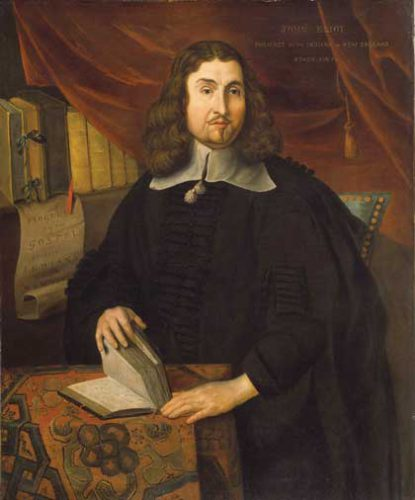
Rev. John Eliot (1604–1690), founder of Roxbury Latin School

Roxbury Latin was founded by residents of Roxbury, Massachusetts to teach Latin grammar to local students. Captain John Johnson donated the land for the Free School and was an instrumental key founder in practice and legacy.

John Eliot, the local minister, believed that a religious society needed to be religiously literate—i.e., well-educated. Like many of New England's oldest schools, the school started out as a one-room schoolhouse in Dudley Square with a single teacher, John Eliot's brother Philip. The school's refusal to close during the American Revolution earned it the title of the oldest school in continuous existence in North America, as Boston Latin School and New York City's Collegiate School both temporarily shut down during the war.

Roxbury Latin's commitment to a college-preparatory education waxed and waned in its first two centuries of existence. In the 1660s it was listed as one of Harvard College's leading feeder schools, but between 1836 and 1844 the school sent only three students to any college. The instability was largely due to the school's financial model. Roxbury Latin was funded by neither taxes nor tuition fees, but by local families who agreed to pay an annual subscription in perpetuity (in reality, until 1789) for the school's maintenance in exchange for free tuition. Its budget was large enough that several distinguished gentlemen taught at Roxbury Latin early in their careers, including future Supreme Court justice William Cushing, future 2nd President of the Massachusetts Provincial Congress Joseph Warren and Massachusetts governor Increase Sumner. However, for the most part, the pay was so uncompetitive relative to the tax-funded schools (in some years Boston Latin paid its teachers twice as much) that most schoolmasters departed after a year or two. Roxbury Latin did not hire a second schoolmaster until 1819.

The school briefly converted to a semi-public institution from 1839 to 1860 in exchange for subsidies from the town of Roxbury, but was expelled from the public school system after it rejected too many students from the town's public elementary schools.

=== Selective college-preparatory institution ===
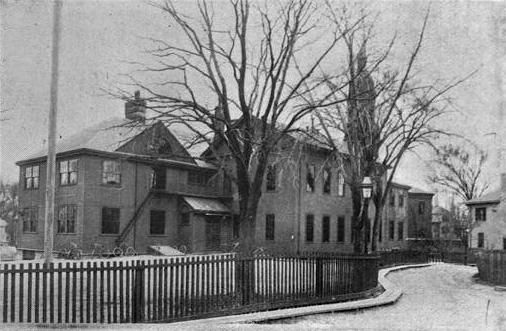
The school at its former location on Kearsarge Avenue in 1899. The school met at various buildings on Kearsarge Avenue from 1835 to 1927.

Under headmaster William Coe Collar (1867–1907), the school quadrupled in size and became the now-familiar college-preparatory institution. Although Collar was a classicist—he wrote popular Latin and Greek textbooks—he expanded Roxbury Latin's classical curriculum beyond Latin, Greek, and mathematics, adding courses in English, modern languages, and science. He also hired specialist teachers to cover these new subjects. When Collar retired in 1907, Harvard president Charles Eliot (no relation to Roxbury's founder John Eliot) said that "[t]here is no better preparatory school in the country." Many of Collar's students went on to found or lead their own schools, including Middlesex (Frederick Winsor '88), St. Paul's (Samuel Drury '97), and Cate (Curtis Cate '03).

Collar financed this expansion by imposing tuition fees for the first time in Roxbury Latin's history, starting in 1882. Although these fees were high by contemporary standards—Roxbury Latin's $100/year tuition handily outpaced Andover and Exeter, and was raised to $150 in 1892—they did not raise enough money, as tuition was waived for students living in Roxbury, who at the time comprised 86% of the student body. Although Collar turned Roxbury Latin into an elite prep school, the school consistently lost money under his leadership. In the 1890s, Collar attempted to convert Roxbury Latin into a boarding school, which could charge higher fees, but the new boarding department was unpopular and quickly abandoned. The board of trustees (a majority of which, by law, lived or worked in Roxbury) repeatedly rejected any attempt to move the school from Roxbury or to impose tuition fees on Roxbury boys. These difficulties were still unresolved when Collar retired in 1907.

=== Country day school ===
The school's escutcheon with the Pine Tree, a symbol of New England since the 17th century, and the Bible with the Christian symbol Alpha and Omega

In the decades following Collar's retirement, several constraints on Roxbury Latin's growth were removed. In 1913, the school's charter was revised to allow alumni, and not Roxbury residents, to control the board of trustees. In 1927, the Massachusetts legislature passed an act confirming that Roxbury Latin would no longer have to educate Roxbury residents for free; however, the school did not charge residents tuition until 1935, and residents did not pay full tuition until 1961.

In 1927, Roxbury Latin moved to its present location in West Roxbury. In accordance with the country day school movement, which argued that students should be educated outside the distractions and pollution of the city, Roxbury Latin's affluent alumni had demanded that the school move from Roxbury (which was now a working-class neighborhood) to a more suburban location. Charles Eliot of Harvard (a harsh critic of the old board) also backed the move, writing in Roxbury Latin's promotional materials that in order to maintain the school's ability to feed students to Harvard, it was "necessary to convert the School into a country day school" by leaving urban Roxbury.

The new location had a noticeable effect on Roxbury Latin's demographics. Although West Roxbury was more affluent than Roxbury, it was heavily Irish Catholic, so mid-century Roxbury Latin was notably diverse (on religious grounds) by New England prep school standards. In the 1944–45 school year, Roxbury Latin educated a roughly equal number of Protestants and Catholics. In addition, Jews were 14% of the student body. The school admitted its first black student in 1960 and its first black graduates (from its old neighborhood of Roxbury) in 1964. In lieu of the Roxbury tuition subsidy, which for school purposes included West Roxbury, the school began offering a conventional financial aid program in 1951; by 1963 roughly one-third of the student body was on scholarship. However, a proposal to admit girls was rejected in the 1970s, and Roxbury Latin remains a boys' school to this day.

On May 16, 1995, former president George H. W. Bush visited the school and addressed the student body.

In 2003, Roxbury Latin hired Kerry Brennan as its headmaster; he had previously served as headmaster of Manhattan's Collegiate School. In 2024, Brennan was succeeded by Sam Schaffer, the head of the Upper School at St. Albans School in Washington, D.C.

The school states that its admission rate is normally around 17% and that 90% of admitted students typically choose to enroll at RL.

== Rankings ==
=== College placement ===
Roxbury Latin has been recognized in several lists of schools that send their students to selective universities.

- 2002: Worth magazine ranked RL #1 in the nation for sending students to Harvard, Yale, or Princeton. Between 1998 and 2001, 21.1% of RL graduates matriculated at one of these three schools.
- 2008: PrepReview.com ranked RL #1 in the nation for sending students to the Ivy League schools, MIT, and Stanford. 45% of RL graduates matriculated at one of these ten schools.
- 2015: MainStreet ranked RL #5 in the nation for sending students to the Ivy League schools. 36% of RL graduates matriculated at one of these eight schools.

In the five-year period from 2019 to 2023, Roxbury Latin placed 84 students at Ivy League schools, nearly half of whom (38) attended Harvard College. Approximately 55 boys graduate from Roxbury Latin every year.

=== General ===
In 2010, Forbes ranked Roxbury Latin the fifth-best prep school in the United States.

== Academics ==
=== Curriculum ===
Roxbury Latin has a 6:1 student-teacher ratio, and the average class size is 12. The school stopped offering Advanced Placement courses in the 2024–25 school year, asserting that it offers honors and accelerated classes which "provide more range and depth than AP courses." Previously, the 54 students in the Class of 2022 took 137 AP examinations by the end of their junior year, and 74% of the papers received a 4 or a 5.

=== Test scores ===
For the Class of 2024, the middle 50% SAT scores were 690–760 in English and 680–760 in math. The school states that "the median standardized testing of each class consistently hovers around 1500."

For the Class of 2025, 7 out of 56 students (12.5%) were recognized as National Merit Scholarship Semifinalists based on their performances on the PSAT/NMSQT. Seven boys were recognized in either the African American or Hispanic Recognition Programs.

== Finances ==
=== Tuition and financial aid ===
Tuition for the 2023–24 academic year is $39,250. Roxbury Latin admits boys on a need-blind basis and commits to provide financial aid that meets 100% of admitted students' demonstrated financial need. 38% of the student body is on financial aid. In the 2023–24 academic year, 87 of the 116 families (75%) receiving financial aid grants had family incomes above $150,000/year.

The school has an unusual policy of charging frontline tuition that is "about 65% of that of other Boston-area independent schools." However, after financial aid is taken into consideration, other day schools may still offer competitive tuition packages once a student is admitted. Roxbury Latin and athletic rivals Belmont Hill and Nobles all claim to meet 100% of admitted students' demonstrated financial need.

School	2023–24 Tuition	2023–24 Average Discount	Family Contribution	% On Aid	Source
Roxbury Latin	$39,250	$26,258	$12,992	38%	
Belmont Hill	$61,400	$48,800	$12,600	28%	
Nobles	$60,100	$44,395	$15,705	30%	

However, since Roxbury Latin is the only need-blind school out of these three, a prospective student seeking financial aid may have a better chance of obtaining admission to RL. Alternatively, a student otherwise eligible for financial aid may nonetheless apply as a full-pay student at Nobles and Belmont Hill to boost their chances of admission. In that case, RL's large discount in frontline tuition (in addition to the continuing possibility of financial aid at RL) becomes directly relevant.

=== Endowment and expenses ===
In June 2024, Roxbury Latin's financial endowment stood at $212 million. In its Internal Revenue Service filings for the 2021–22 school year, Roxbury Latin reported total assets of $279.9 million, net assets of $248.5 million, investment holdings of $183.4 million, and cash holdings of $5.2 million. Roxbury Latin also reported $18.6 million in program service expenses and $2.8 million in grants (primarily student financial aid).

== Athletics ==
Roxbury Latin's athletic teams play in the Independent School League, a group of private day and boarding schools in Greater Boston. The school offers varsity, junior varsity and lower-level teams in football, cross country, soccer (fall), basketball, ice hockey, wrestling (winter), baseball, tennis, lacrosse, and track and field (spring).

Teams of note include:

- Tennis. Roxbury Latin has won the conference championship eight of the last 11 seasons in which a title was awarded. It won the NEPSAC Class B tournament in 2013, 2019, and 2022, and has been a finalist four other times since 2011.
- Wrestling. Roxbury Latin's former head coach Steve Ward is a member of the National Wrestling Hall of Fame. At the time of his induction, his all-time record at Roxbury Latin was 357-57-1.
- Track & Field. The track team has won its division of the New England Prep School Track Association championship in nine of the last eleven years, including five in a row from 2011 to 2015. The team also won the Independent School Track Association Championship in 2012 and 2013.
- Cross Country. The cross country team won the NEPSAC Class B Cross Country championship in 2025, 2024, 2023, 2021, 2019, 2018, and 2017. The team also won the Interscholastic League Championship in 2021, 2018, and 2017 and finished second in 2023, 2018, and 2016. In 2017, the team went undefeated.

== Extracurriculars ==
Roxbury Latin offers a school newspaper, a yearbook, an art magazine called Forum, several language clubs, a debate team, a Model United Nations group, and various community service clubs.

=== Theater ===
The theater program typically shows one junior play, one senior play, and one musical every year. In 2025, Night of Scenes replaced the junior play in order to provide more students access to the drama program. This is now a biennial event. The theater program offers RL students the opportunity to meet girls from neighboring schools.

=== Music ===
Roxbury Latin offers a variety of singing groups, including a middle school choir, a high school glee club, and a fifteen-boy a cappella group. Additionally, the school operates a jazz band and combo, a guitar ensemble, and certain chamber ensembles.

=== Robotics ===
Roxbury Latin participates in Vex Robotics, an annual interscholastic robotics competition. The school team placed 5th in the New England Division in 2009. In 2010, it placed 2nd out of 19 teams, a school record. In 2023 the school qualified three teams for nationals.

=== Chess ===
The chess club has won or shared the South Shore Interscholastic Chess League title in 2 of the last 5 years.

== Notable alumni ==
=== Colonists ===
- James Pierpont (1677), principal founder of Yale University
- Paul Dudley (1686), Chief Justice of Massachusetts Supreme Judicial Court (1745–1751) and Attorney General of Massachusetts (1702–1718)
- John Wise (1669), clergyman credited with revolutionary phrase "no taxation without representation"
- Joseph Warren (1755), Continental Army General who was killed at the Battle of Bunker Hill, surgeon
- Increase Sumner (1763), governor of Massachusetts (1797–1799), Justice of Massachusetts Supreme Judicial Court (1782–1797)
- John Warren (1767), founder of Harvard Medical School, renowned surgeon

=== Business ===
- Francis Cabot Lowell (1789), businessman, member of Boston Lowell family, founder of Lowell, Massachusetts
- Arthur Vining Davis (1884), president of Aluminum Company of America (1910–1949), educational benefactor
- James Dole (1895), founder of the Hawaiian Company in Honolulu, Hawaii currently known as Dole Food Company
- Albert Hamilton Gordon (1919), Wall Street businessman, philanthropist
- David R. Godine (1960), publisher
- Roger Altman (1963), founder and chairman of Evercore

=== Sciences ===
- Charles Russell Lowell, Sr. (1796), Royal Society and Harvard University fellow
- Robert W. Wood (1887), American physicist, professor at Johns Hopkins University
- Edward Lee Thorndike (1891), famed psychologist, former professor at Columbia, member of National Academy of Sciences
- Paul Dudley White (1903), "Father of Modern Cardiology," noted cardiologist, founder of American Heart Association
- James B. Sumner (1906), noted chemist, recipient of 1946 Nobel Prize in Chemistry
- James Bryant Conant (1910), president of Harvard University, ambassador to Germany
- Marland P. Billings (1919), noted geologist, Penrose Medal winner, Harvard University professor
- Robert Ross Holloway (1934), American archaeologist, Brown University professor
- Robert Angus Brooks (1936), noted American philologist and former Under Secretary of the Smithsonian Institution
- Jared Diamond (1954), noted biologist, author and Pulitzer Prize-winner for Guns, Germs, and Steel: The Fates of Human Societies
- Peter Derow (1961), voice alteration innovator, renowned historian, scholar; lecturer at Oxford University
- Harry Lewis (1964), dean of Harvard College, Harvard Professor
- Walter Bender (1973), former Executive Director of MIT Media Lab and founder of Sugar Labs
- Martino Poggio (1996), physicist, professor at University of Basel

=== Arts, literature, music, and journalism ===
- Edmund M. Wheelwright (1872), architect, designer of Boston and Cambridge, Massachusetts landmarks such as Longfellow Bridge, Horticultural Hall, and Jordan Hall
- George Lyman Kittredge (1875), influential literary scholar and professor at Harvard University
- Frederick Law Olmsted Jr. (1890), landscape architect and journalist
- William H. Littlefield (1920), abstract expressionist painter
- Peter Ivers (1964), musician, composer, host of New Wave Theatre
- John Semper Jr. (1970), writer, story-editor, producer focusing primarily on animation, children's television, and comedy such as Jay Jay the Jet Plane, Spider-Man: The Animated Series, and Class Act
- William Landay (1981), novelist
- Christopher Payne (1986), photographer
- Adam Granduciel (1997), frontman and primary songwriter of The War on Drugs
- Sidik Fofana (2001), writer
- Stefan Jackiw (2003), classical violinist
- Sam Jacobs (2004), editor-in-chief of Time Magazine

=== Politics, military, and public service ===
- Edwin Upton Curtis (1878), 34th and youngest-ever Mayor of Boston
- Clifton Sprague (1913), U.S. Navy Admiral in World War 2 and Navy Cross recipient for leadership in Battle off Samar
- Richard W. Murphy (1947), former U.S. Ambassador to Saudi Arabia, Syria, Mauritania, Philippines, television commentator
- Richard Barnet (1948), activist, scholar, co-founder of the Institute for Policy Studies
- Christopher Lydon (1958), radio broadcaster and former host of NPR's "The Connection"
- Peter Rodman (1961), former Assistant Secretary of Defense
- Roger Altman (1963), deputy Secretary of Treasury in Clinton administration
- Daniel K. Tarullo (1969), member Federal Reserve Board of Governors 2009-2017
- Michael J. Astrue (1974), former Commissioner of Social Security Administration
- Mark C. Storella (1977), Ambassador
- Ian Heath Gershengorn (1984), former Acting Solicitor General of the United States
- Patrick F. Philbin (1985), Deputy Counsel to the President in the Office of White House Counsel in the Trump administration
- John R. Connolly (1991), former at-large member of Boston City Council

=== Athletics ===
- William Welles Hoyt (1894), gold medal winner in the pole vault at the 1896 Olympic Games in Athens
- Malcolm Whitman (1895), tennis star, U.S. open champion in 1898, 1899, and 1900, member of original Davis Cup team and of Tennis Hall of Fame
- Stuart McNay (2000), member of Team USA's sailing team in the 2008, 2012, and 2016 Olympics
- Aaron Maund (2008), MLS soccer player
- Danny O'Regan, professional hockey player
- Andrew Wheeler-Omiunu (2013), MLS Soccer player

== See also ==
- Boston Latin School
- Brooklyn Latin School
- List of the oldest schools in the world
- David W. Frank, author and long-time Director of Dramatics
