= William H. Littlefield =

American painter (1902–1969)

- Born: William Horace Littlefield; October 28, 1902
- Died: July 5, 1969 (aged 66); Falmouth, Massachusetts, U.S.
- Education: Roxbury Latin School; Harvard University
- Occupation: Painter
- Style: Abstract expressionism

William (Bill) Horace Littlefield (October 28, 1902 – July 5, 1969) was an American painter known for his figure studies of male nudes and in later life his large paintings in an abstract expressionist style.

== Early life ==
Littlefield first developed an interest in art and classicism while attending the Roxbury Latin School. Littlefield subsequently attended Harvard University, where he studied painting on the side with Adeline Wolever, a Canadian-American painter schooled in the traditional Boston School style of Frank Benson, Edmund Tarbell, and William Paxton. After graduating from Harvard in 1924, Littlefield departed for Paris to further his studies in painting, and where he met and shared a studio with the English painter and printmaker Stanley William Hayter.

== Career ==
After returning to the U.S. in 1929 Littlefield settled first in Boston and then on his parents’ property at Falmouth, Massachusetts on Cape Cod during the summers. It was in Falmouth where he would first explore landscape painting and where he would secure his first major commissions and exhibitions.

In 1931, he was commissioned by Lincoln Kirstein to create stage sets for the American Ballet’s first production of Serenade and Mozartiana at the Wadsworth Atheneum in Hartford, Connecticut. He was invited in 1932 to participate in the Whitney Museum’s First Biennial and in 1936 a group exhibition at the Museum of Modern Art (MOMA). He had his first solo exhibition at the Grace Horne Galleries in Boston in 1938. His work was also part of the painting event in the art competition at the 1932 Summer Olympics.

In 1942, Littlefield volunteered to join the U.S. Army during World War II and served faithfully until he was discharged in 1945. After the war, Littlefield sold his house in Boston and relocated full-time to Falmouth.

In 1947, Littlefield co-founded the Cape Cod Art Association. He first exhibited at the Provincetown Art Association in 1949. In the fall of 1951, Littlefield rented a studio in Manhattan to study with Morris Davidson and, during the summer of 1952, with Hans Hofmann in Provincetown.

He died at this home on Falmouth in July 1969.

== Legacy ==
Littlefield left over 3,000 drawings, watercolors, and oils on paper, board and canvas. His work is included in both private and public collections including the Museum of Fine Arts, Boston, the Harvard Art Museums, the Worcester Art Museum, the Cape Cod Museum of Art, Smith College Museum of Art, the New Hampshire Institute of Art, the Addison Gallery, and the Museum of Modern Art in New York. The Cape Cod Museum of Art organized a retrospective of Littlefield’s work in 2006.
