= Marten Scheffer =

Dutch ecologist and mathematical biologist

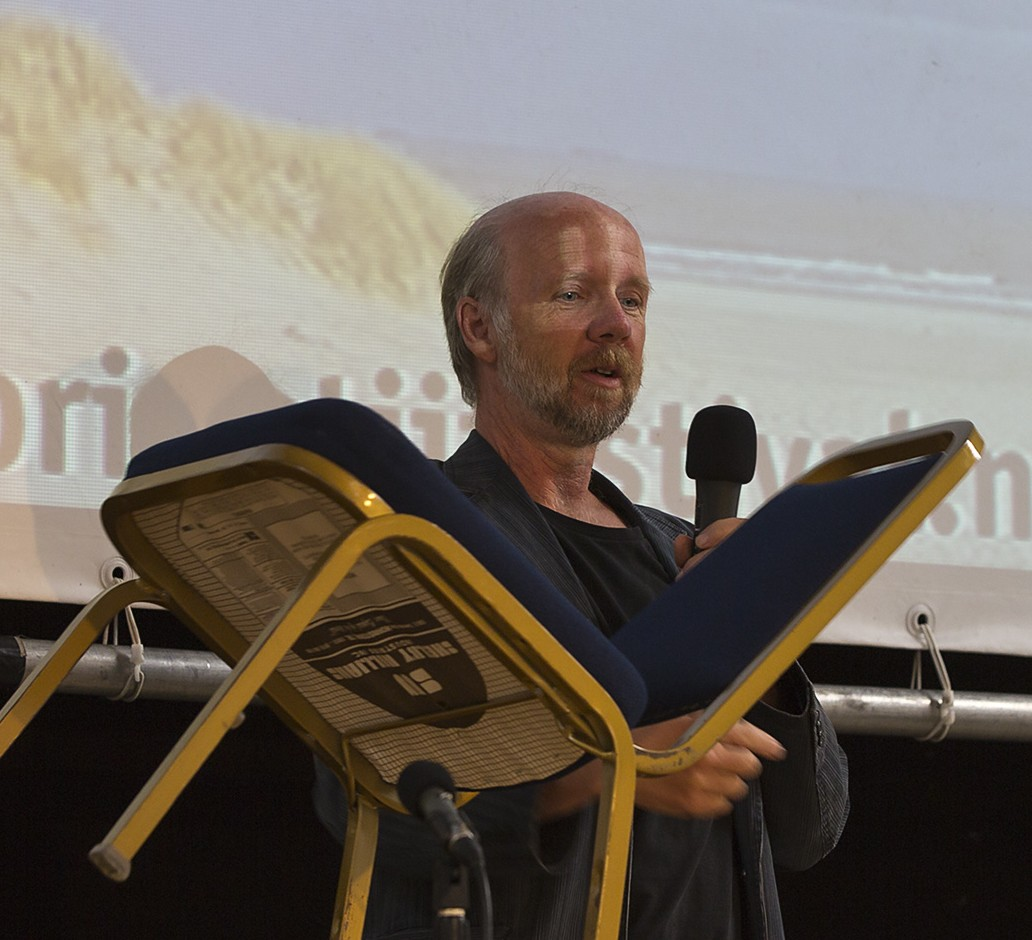
- Scheffer in 2013
- Born: 13 September 1958 (age 67); Amsterdam, Netherlands
- Education: Utrecht University
- Awards: Spinoza Prize (2009), BBVA Foundation Frontiers of Knowledge Award (2016), Foreign associate of the US National Academy of Sciences (2019)
- Scientific career
- Fields: Ecology, biology, complex systems
- Workplaces: Wageningen University and Research Centre

Marten Scheffer (born 13 September 1958) is a Dutch ecologist, mathematical biologist and professor of Aquatic Ecology and Water Quality Management at Wageningen University and Research Centre. He was a winner of the 2009 Spinoza Prize. His research focuses on complex systems and their adaptability.

== Career ==
Scheffer was born on 13 September 1958 in Amsterdam, Netherlands. He studied ecology at Utrecht University and gained a degree in 1985. He obtained a doctorate from the same university in 1992. He subsequently held research positions at Dorschkamp and the governmental agency RIZA. In 1998 he became professor of Aquatic Ecology and Water Quality Management at Wageningen University and Research Centre and has since headed the department. Scheffer's research focuses on complex systems and their adaptability, finding that different ecosystems have tipping points. His research is located inside the field of ecology as well as outside of it, with studies into climate change and evolution.

In 2009 Scheffer was one of three winners of the Dutch Spinoza Prize and received a 2.5 million euro grant. The awarding organisation, the Netherlands Organisation for Scientific Research (NWO), praised Scheffer for his contributions "to our understanding of critical transitions in complex systems, varying from shifts in shallow lakes to climate change and the collapse of ancient cultures". As there was no fourth Spinoza Prize awarded in 2009, Scheffer and his co-winners Albert van den Berg and Michel Ferrari asked the NWO to reward them the remaining prize money, which they would spend on a collaborative research effort. Their efforts culminated in a research paper on migraine published in PLOS ONE in 2013. The paper claimed that a critical tipping point of neurons started a migraine attack.

Scheffer is member of the Royal Netherlands Academy of Arts and Sciences since 2012. He is a co-founder of the South American Institute for Resilience and Sustainability Studies and European Institute Para Limes. He was elected a foreign associate of the US National Academy of Sciences in April 2019.

Scheffer won the BBVA Foundation Frontiers of Knowledge Award (2016) jointly with Gene E. Likens for contributing decisively to what the jury described as "one of the major challenges" of this scientific discipline: to understand and, where possible, anticipate ecosystem responses to human-induced alterations of the natural environment.

Apart from his work in science Scheffer is also a musician, who plays the mandolin, guitar and violin. Scheffer toured with Dutch guitar player Harry Sacksioni for several years. Together with two others he has published a CD of world music, Transitions.

== Publications ==
- Critical Transitions in Nature and Society, 2009, Princeton University Press.
- Vijver, sloot en plas, 2005, Tirion Natuur.
- Ecology of Shallow Lakes, 2004, Springer Netherlands.

== Art ==
In 2018 Scheffer unveiled a large beetle sculpture named 'Must Leave' in honour of the Centenary of Wageningen University & Research. He created the beetle together with Danish sculptor Vagn Iversen, known for his hyper-realistic installations.
