= Michel Ferrari =

Swiss neurologist

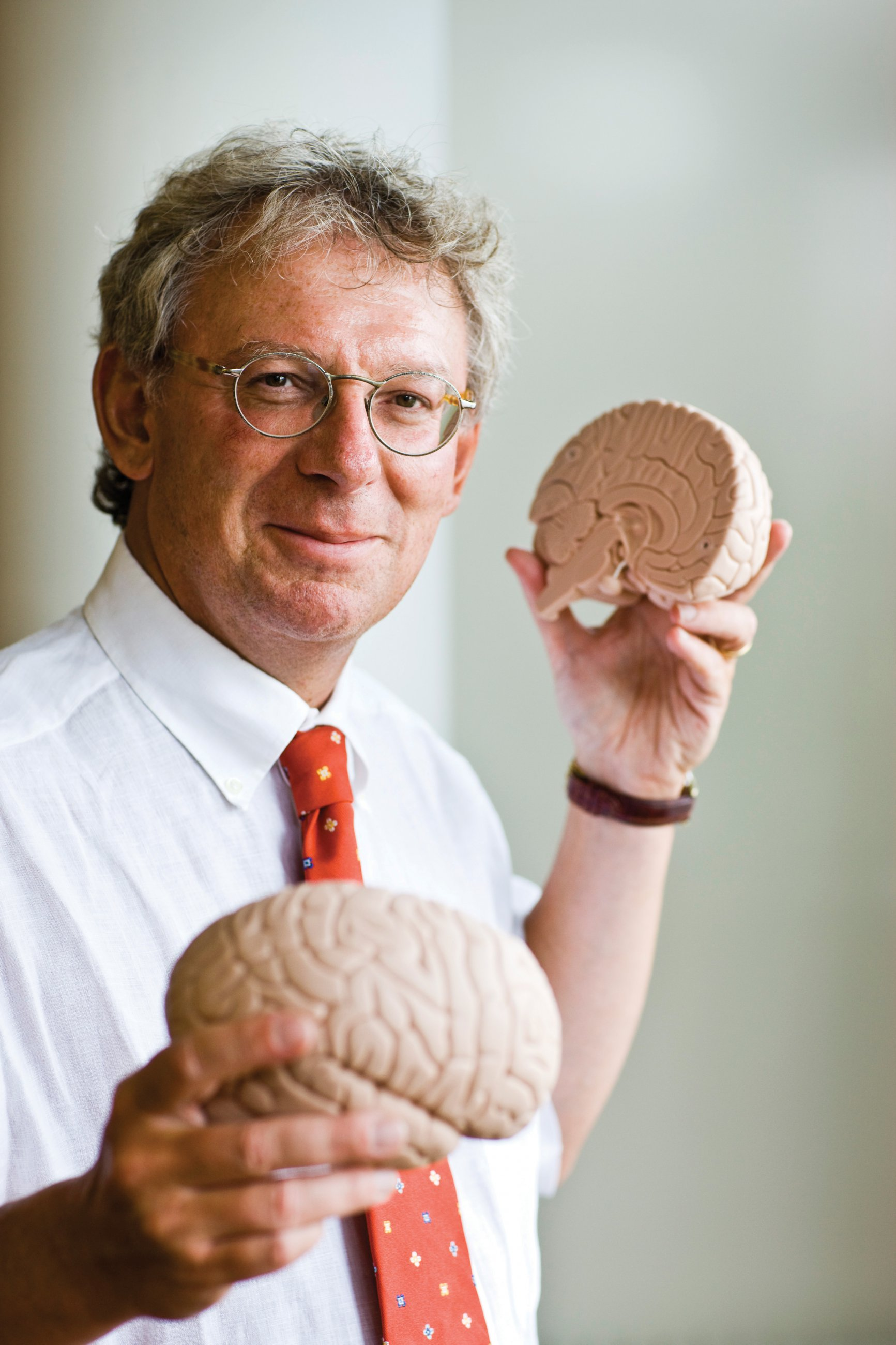
Michel Ferrari (2009)

Michel D. Ferrari (born 15 July 1954) is a Swiss neurologist and professor of neurology at Leiden University and Leiden University Medical Center. He was a winner of the 2009 Spinoza Prize. He is considered to be the foremost migraine expert of the Netherlands, as well as one of the six top scientist in the field worldwide.

== Career ==
Ferrari was born on 15 July 1954 in Tandjong Pandan, Indonesia. He studied medicine at Leiden University and gained a degree in 1980. He obtained a doctorate cum laude from the same university in 1992. Ferrari was appointed as professor of neurology at Leiden in 2002; he still works as a practising neurologist in the university hospital. Apart from his work at the University, Ferrari also served as president of the International Headache Society.

In 1996, a research group under his guidance found the first genes related to migraines. His paper describing the discovery is the highest cited in the field. Between 1996 and 2009 Ferrari and his research groups managed to track four further genes involved in migraines.

In 2009, he was one of three winners of the Dutch Spinoza Prize and received a 2.5 million euro grant. The awarding organisation, the Netherlands Organisation for Scientific Research (NWO), praised Ferrari for being the first to discover the genes related to migraine, as well as developing drugs to treat migraine attacks. The NWO also applauded Ferrari's work as an ambassador for people suffering from migraines. The NWO named Ferrari one of the six "Headache Masters". Shortly after winning the prize, Ferrari stated to want to spend the money on research on glia cells. As there was no fourth Spinoza Prize awarded in 2009, Ferrari and his co-winners Albert van den Berg and Marten Scheffer asked the NWO to reward them the remaining prize money, which they would spend on a collaborative research effort. Their efforts culminated in a research paper on migraine published in PLOS ONE in 2013. The paper claimed that a critical tipping point of neurons started a migraine attack.

== Publications ==
- Alles over hoofdpijn en aangezichtspijn, 1997, together with Joost Haan.
