= Nanotechnology Industries Association =

Organization

Nanotechnology Industries Association (NIA)

- NIA Members Map
- Abbreviation: NIA
- Formation: January 1, 2005; 21 years ago
- Founded at: London
- Type: Nonprofit organisation
- Legal status: Industry Association
- Purpose: Nanotechnology, Innovation, Advocacy, Representation
- Headquarters: Brussels, Belgium
- Location: Brussels, London, Lisbon
- Region served: Worldwide
- Members: Corporate, Affiliate and Associate
- Secretary General: Sean Kelly (Interim)
- Website: www.nanotechia.org

The Nanotechnology Industries Association (NIA) is the sector-independent expert, membership and advocacy organisation providing a responsible voice for the industrial nanotechnologies supply chains. The NIA works with regulators and stakeholders on the national, European and international levels so as to secure a supportive environment for the continuing advancement and establishment of nanotechnologies.

Members of the NIA are represented on globally influential fora, such the OECD Working Party on Manufactured Nanomaterials, and the OECD Working Party on Nanotechnology, International Organization for Standardization (ISO), European Committee for Standardization (CEN) as well as national and international advisory groups.

The NIA was originally founded in London in 2005 as a limited company with initial funding from the UK Government's MNT (micro and nanotechnology) funding scheme with the aim of creating an industrial association that could support companies working in the area of nanotechnology. The NIA's board was drawn from some of the founding companies, including Oxonica and QinetiQ Nanomaterials Limited (QNL) and its founding Director General was Dr Steffi Friedrichs. In 2009 the NIA moved to Brussels, the centre of chemical regulations in Europe and established its new Belgium registered aisbl.

== The NIA stands for ==
The Nanotechnology Industries Association, NIA, promotes a responsible and sustainable innovation in nanotechnology following an approach based on scientific and technical evidence. The NIA stands for:

- a framework of shared principles for the safe, sustainable and socially supportive development and use of nanotechnologies,
- a publicly and regulatory supportive environment for the continuing advancement and establishment of nanotechnology innovation.

== How the NIA operates ==
The NIA's Corporate Membership is open to all companies or organisations involved in, or seeking to be involved in the research, development, manufacturing, marketing or sale of nanotechnology products and processes as well as those who provide the equipment or the technical and engineering services required for their production (including all forms of information technology). The activities of the NIA are driven and conducted by its collective membership, supported by broad-based Associate Membership and Affiliate Membership with expertises in matters such as scientific research, IP protection, regulation, legislation, insurance, and finance.
