= Roderick Lim =

Singaporean nano- and biophysicist

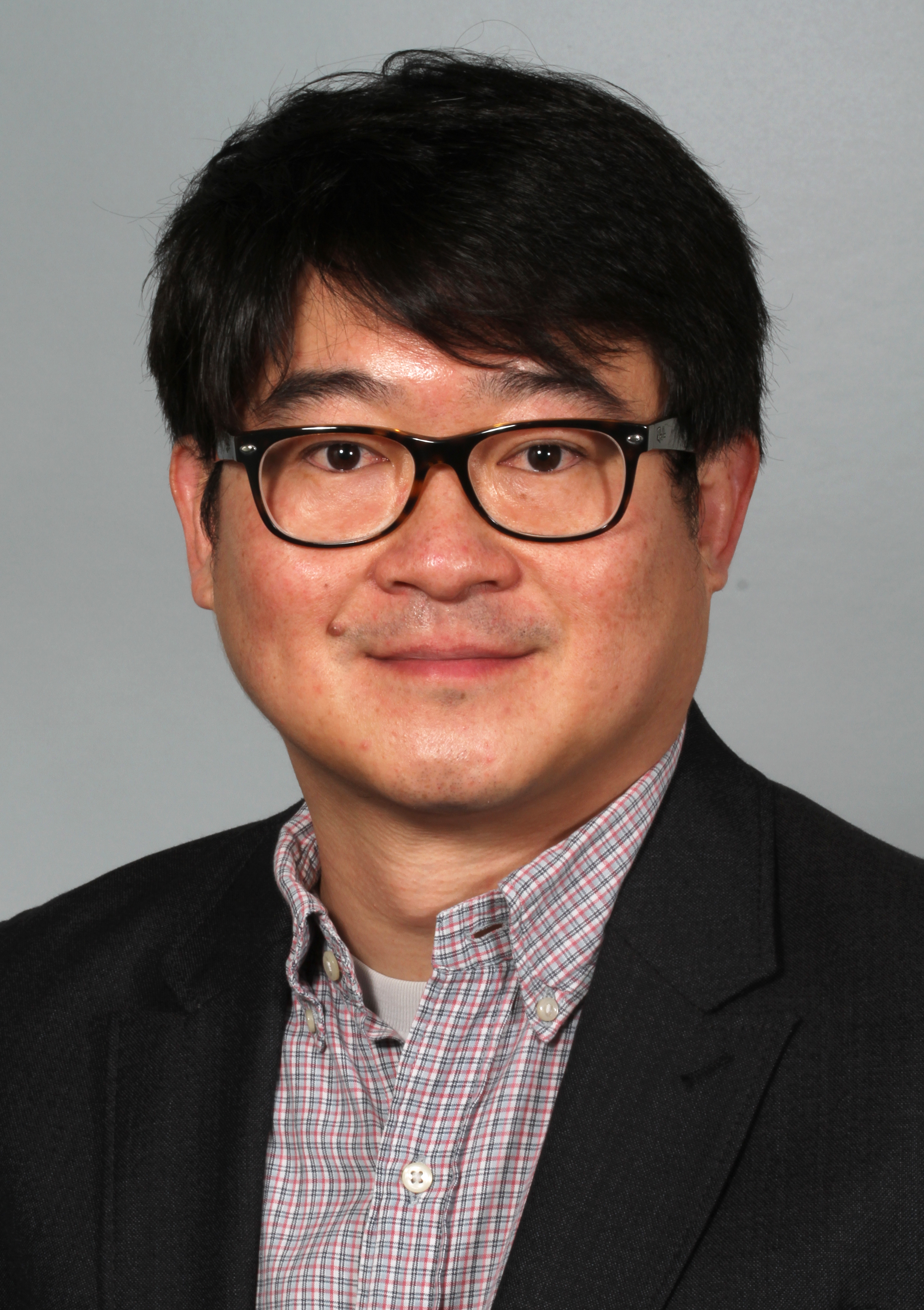
- Roderick Lim (2014)
- Scientific career
- Fields: Nanophysicist
- Workplaces: University of North Carolina at Chapel Hill, National University of Singapore, M.E. Mueller Institute for Structural Biology, Biozentrum University of Basel

Roderick Y. H. Lim is a Singaporean nano- and biophysicist at the Biozentrum of the University of Basel, Switzerland.

== Life ==
Lim studied physics at the University of North Carolina at Chapel Hill. In 2003 he obtained his PhD from the National University of Singapore for research carried out at the Institute of Materials Research and Engineering. This was followed by postdoctoral work at the M.E. Mueller Institute for Structural Biology at the Biozentrum until 2008. In 2009, he was appointed Argovia Professor for nanobiology at the Biozentrum and the Swiss Nanoscience Institute, where he received tenure in early 2014.

== Work ==
Lim is interested in nucleocytoplasmic transport regulation, its impact on cellular function, and how this phenomenon can be leveraged towards bio-inspired applications. He studies how karyopherin receptors facilitate this highly rapid and selective process through nuclear pore complexes (NPCs). Lim combines biophysical, nanotechnological, and cellular approaches to unravel the emergent physical principles that underlie biological function and then verify the results in biomimetic systems. His key contributions include a karyopherin-centric model of the NPC and the discovery of two-dimensional transport control in artificial systems. Of late, he has gravitated towards mechanobiology, in particular cell motility and cancer progression. Lim is a co-inventor of ARTIDIS ("Automated and Reliable Tissue Diagnostics"), an atomic force microscope-based innovation for cancer diagnosis.

== Awards and honors ==
- 2008 Pierre-Gilles de Gennes Prize
