= Swiss Nanoscience Institute =

Swiss research institute

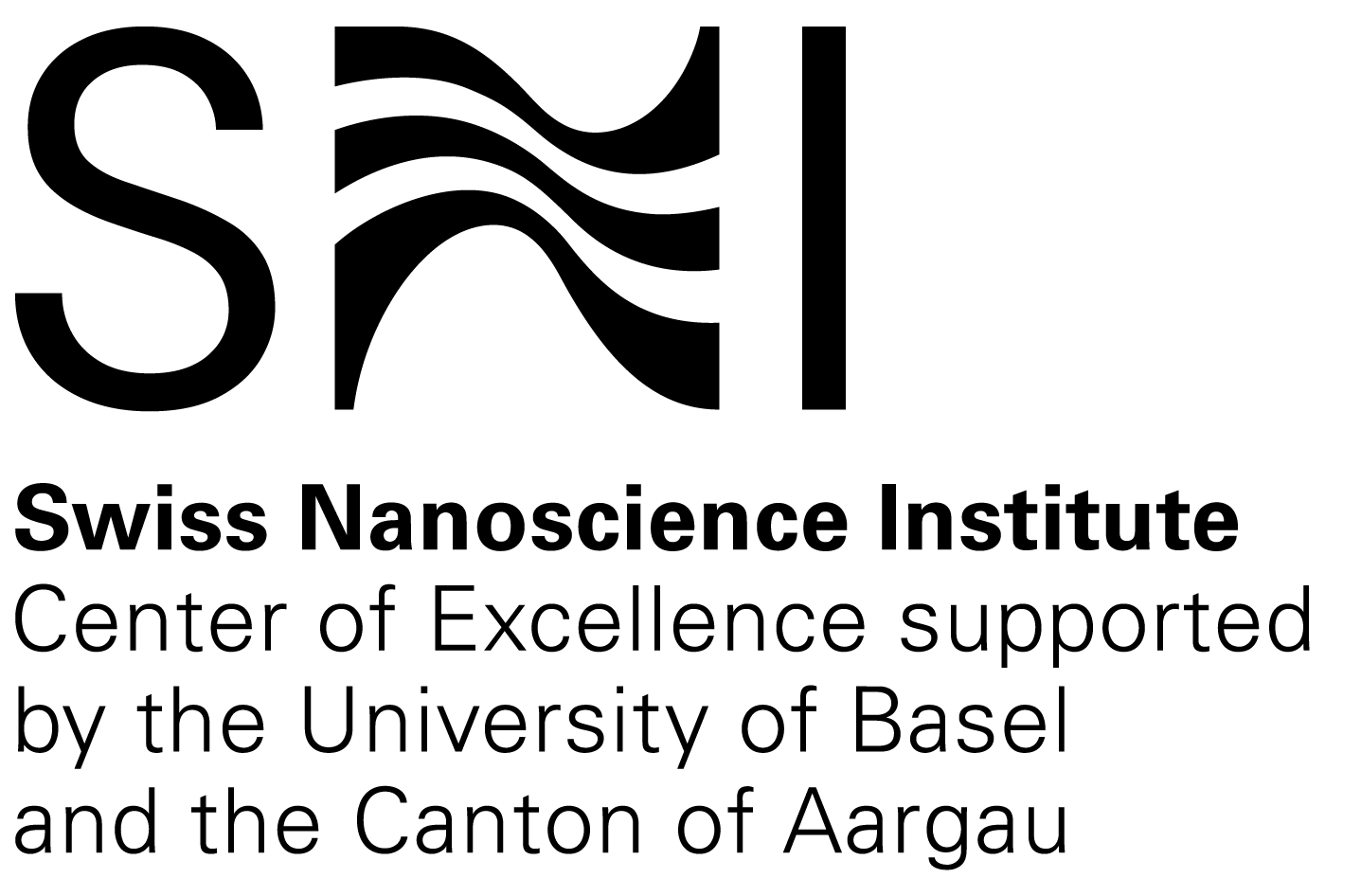
- Established: 2006
- Head: Prof. Martino Poggio (director)
- Owner: University of Basel, Canton Aargau
- Location: Basel, Switzerland
- Website: Swiss Nanoscience Institute

The Swiss Nanoscience Institute (SNI) at the University of Basel is a center of excellence for nanosciences and nanotechnology in Northwestern Switzerland (Aargau, Basel-Stadt, Basel-Landschaft, and Solothurn). It was founded in 2006 by the Canton of Aargau and the University of Basel to succeed the National Center of Competence in Research (NCCR) Nanoscale Science. Its mission is to support research, technology transfer, and academics in the nanoscience's and nanotechnology. The SNI is based on an interdisciplinary network of partner organizations and researchers who participate in basic or applied research projects and are involved in educating nanoscience's students and doctoral students at the University of Basel. The SNI includes the Nano Technology Center at the University of Basel, which encompasses the Nano Imaging Lab and the Nano Fabrication Lab. These two service units provide academic institutions and industrial companies with services in the areas of microscopic imaging and analysis (electron microscopy and scanning probe microscopy) and nanofabrication.

== Education ==
The SNI organizes and coordinates the interdisciplinary bachelor’s and master’s degree programs in nanosciences at the University of Basel, which have been offered since 2002.

Students on the bachelor’s program first receive a comprehensive grounding in biology, chemistry, physics and mathematics and can then choose from an extensive range of electives over the course of their studies. Students on the master’s program choose one specialization module from the fields of nanobiology, medical nanosciences, nanochemistry and nanophysics but their education remains otherwise interdisciplinary until the end of the master’s degree program. The course is intended to qualify students for future work at the interface between different disciplines, where they can help to solve outstanding societal challenges.

In 2012, the SNI expanded its program to include PhD students. Based at the University of Basel, this school has around 40 international doctoral students enrolled in any given year.

== Research and technology transfer ==
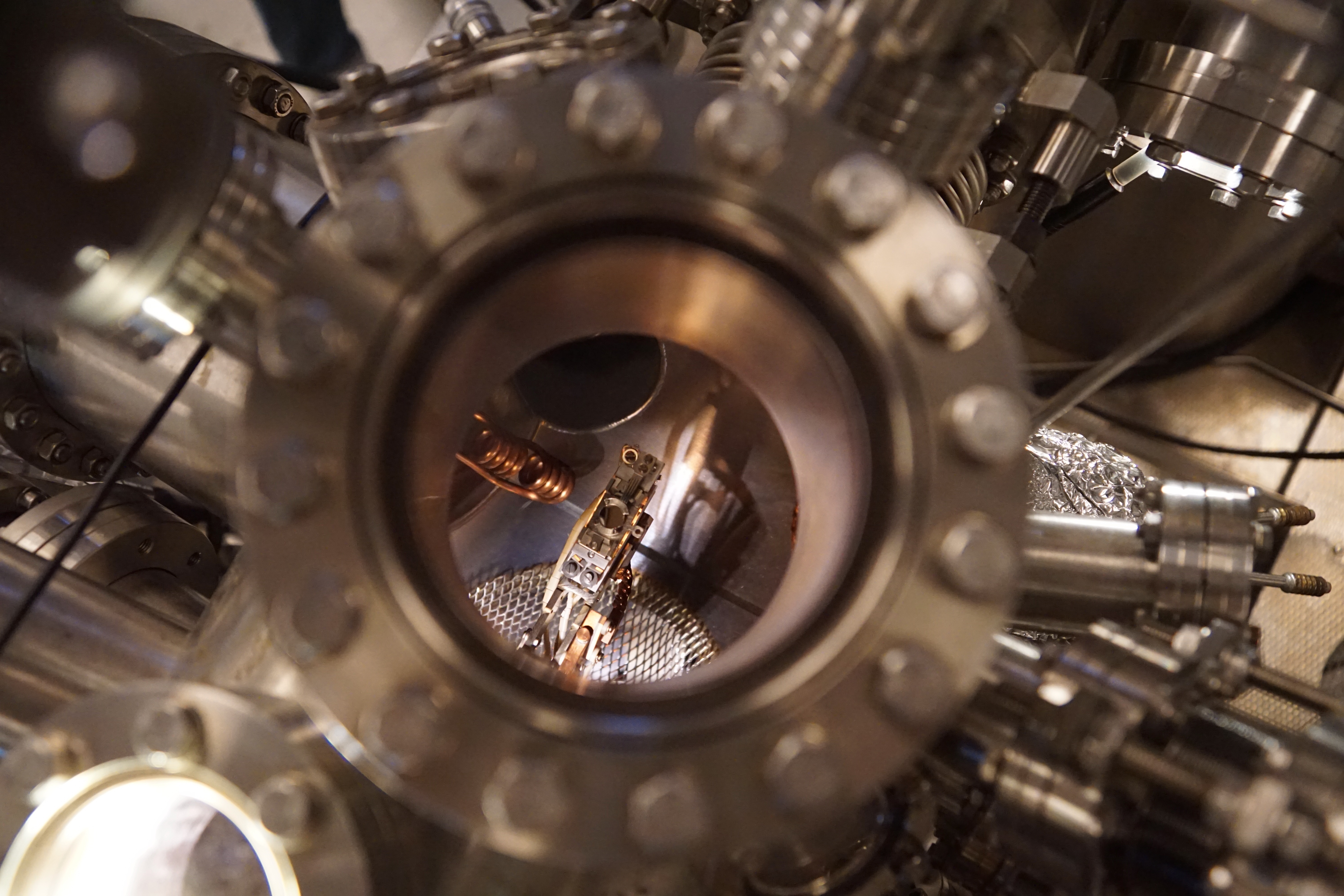
Nanoscience at the SNI: Sample in the high vacuum chamber of a scanning probe microscope.

In the SNI network, interdisciplinary teams conduct basic and applied research in various fields, such as the life sciences, medical technology, sensor technology, photonics, phononics and materials science. At the same time, the SNI provides financial support for the two Argovia professors Roderick Lim (nanobiology) and Martino Poggio (nanomagnetism, nanosensors) as well as three titular professors at the Paul Scherrer Institute, each of whom has a teaching contract at the University of Basel.

As part of the Nano-Argovia program, the SNI actively supports knowledge and technology transfer to industrial companies from Northwestern Switzerland.

Collaboration with industry is also supported by the ANAXAM technology transfer center, of which the SNI is a founding member. ANAXAM provides companies throughout Switzerland with access to state-of-the-art analytical methods. Founded in 2023, the Swiss Photonics Integration Center (Swiss PIC) has plans to provide these companies with access to, in particular, innovative optical systems.

== Services ==
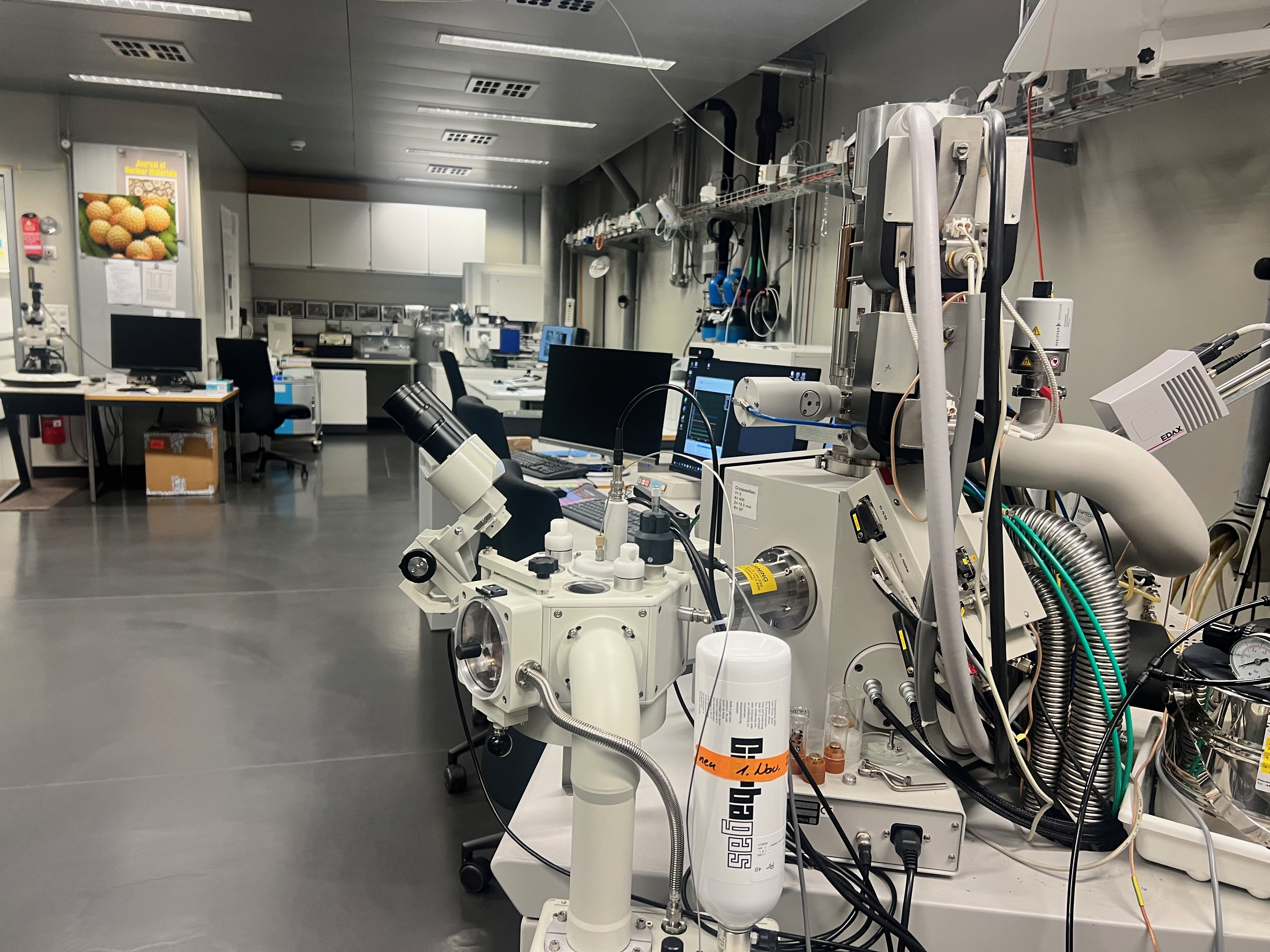
The Nano Imaging Lab of the Swiss Nanoscience Institute

The SNI is available as a provider of various services to partners in academia and industry. Forming part of the SNI since 2016, the Nano Imaging Lab (NI Lab) provides comprehensive services in the area of surface imaging and analysis.

== Organization ==
The SNI is managed by an Executive Committee whose members include the director of the SNI, professors from network partners and the SNI General Manager. The Executive Committee ensures communication with network partners, decides on the allocation of funding and is accountable to the highest supervisory body, the Argovia Committee. Moreover, the Executive Committee is also responsible for ensuring compliance with university guidelines and contractual agreements with the Canton of Aargau.

The SNI includes all project leaders involved in SNI projects, all doctoral students, the staff of the Nano Technology Center, the SNI management team, and voluntary members. At the end of 2022, the SNI had 166 members. From 2006 to 2022, the SNI was led by Professor Christian Schönenberger as its director. Professor Martino Poggio became the new director in August 2022.

== Public relations ==
The SNI team plays an active role in public relations and outreach with a view to providing information about the nanosciences in general, encouraging an interest in the natural sciences, and helping a wide audience gain a better understanding of research work. To this end, the institute arranges visitor programs and workshops for school classes, maintains a presence at science fairs and provides extensive materials, including instructions for experiments that people can carry out themselves.

== See also ==
- Science and technology in Switzerland
- Nanotechnology
