= Journal of Nanophotonics =

Scientific journal on nanophotonics

- Discipline: Nanophotonics
- Language: English
- Edited by: Ali Adibi

Publication details
- History: 2007–present
- Publisher: SPIE
- Frequency: Quarterly
- Impact factor: 1 (2025)

Standard abbreviations
- ISO 4: J. Nanophotonics

Indexing
- CODEN: JNOACQ
- ISSN: 1934-2608
- OCLC no.: 1236225784

Links
- Journal homepage; Online access

Journal of Nanophotonics is a peer-reviewed scientific journal published quartertly by SPIE. It covers theoretical, computational and experimental aspects of nanophotonics and their applications. It began publication in 2007 with Akhlesh Lakhtakia of Pennsylvania State University as its editor-in-chief. In 2013, Ali Adibi of Georgia Institute of Technology became its second editor-in-chief.

== Abstracting and indexing ==
The journal is abstracted and indexed in:

- Current Contents/Engineering, Computing & Technology
- Current Contents/Physical, Chemical & Earth Sciences
- EBSCO databases
- Ei Compendex
- Inspec
- Science Citation Index Expanded
- Scopus

According to the Journal Citation Reports, the journal has a 2025 impact factor of .
