= American National Standards Institute Nanotechnology Panel =

The American National Standards Institute–Nanotechnology Standards Panel (ANSI-NSP) enables stakeholders in nanotechnology to work together to coordinate the development of voluntary standards. Such standards include terminology and materials properties and measurement procedures to facilitate commercialization of applications and uses of nanotechnology.

== History ==
ANSI established the panel in August 2004, and membership is open to all parties interested in nanotechnology standards.

By 2018, the group was recognized as one of "promoters of Nanotechnology." The organization appears in the usual directories of internationally recognized nanotechnology organizations.

ANSI leaders participates in academic conferences, including at Pharmaceutics 2022 in Dubai, and in 2024 at Purdue University.

== Objectives ==
Objectives of the ANSI-NSP include:

- Providing a forum to define needs, determine work plans and establish priorities for updating standards or creating new standards.
- Soliciting participation from sectors that have not traditionally participated in the voluntary standards system.
- Facilitating the development and adoption of standards in the area of nanotechnology in general and nomenclature/terminology specifically.
- Making available the results of the panel's work.
