= NanoNed =

Dutch nanotechnology research initiative

NanoNed was the nanotechnology research and development initiative of the Dutch government.. It was financed Ministry of Economic Affairs (Netherlands).[2] is responsible for the program management of NanoNed . It is a consortium of seven universities, TNO and Philips. University of Leiden, University of Utrecht and FOM institute AMOLF in Amsterdam are also the partners of NanoNed . Around 400 researchers worked within all these partners. On the basis of national research and development strengths and industrial needs, 11 interdependent programmes were developed and named “flagships”. Each of these flagships is led by a "Flagship Captain". In 2009, more than 400 researchers were working on around 200 projects.The program ran from 2004 until 2010 as part of the Dutch government's investments in nanotechnology research infrastructure.

NanoNed also established its first foreign office in Japan (NanoNed Japan Office), led by Prof. Wilfred van der Wiel..

== Flagship ==
- Advanced NanoProbing
- BioNanoSystems
- Bottom-up Nano-Electronics
- Chemistry and Physics of Individual Molecules
- Nano Electronic Materials
- NanoFabrication
- Nanofluidics
- NanoInstrumentation
- NanoPhotonics
- Nano-Spintronics
- Quantum Computing

== Consortium Partners ==
- MESA+ Institute for Nanotechnology, University of Twente
- Kavli Institute of Nanoscience, Delft University of Technology
- Centre for Nano Materials, Eindhoven University of Technology
- BioMaDe, University of Groningen
- Institute for Molecules and Materials, Radboud University Nijmegen
- BioNT, Wageningen University and Research Centre
- HIMS, University of Amsterdam
- TNO Science and Industry
- Philips Electronics Nederland

== Co-operation partners ==
- AMOLF
- Leiden University
- Utrecht University

== See also ==
- List of nanotechnology organizations
