= CytoViva =

Scientific imaging and instrumentation company

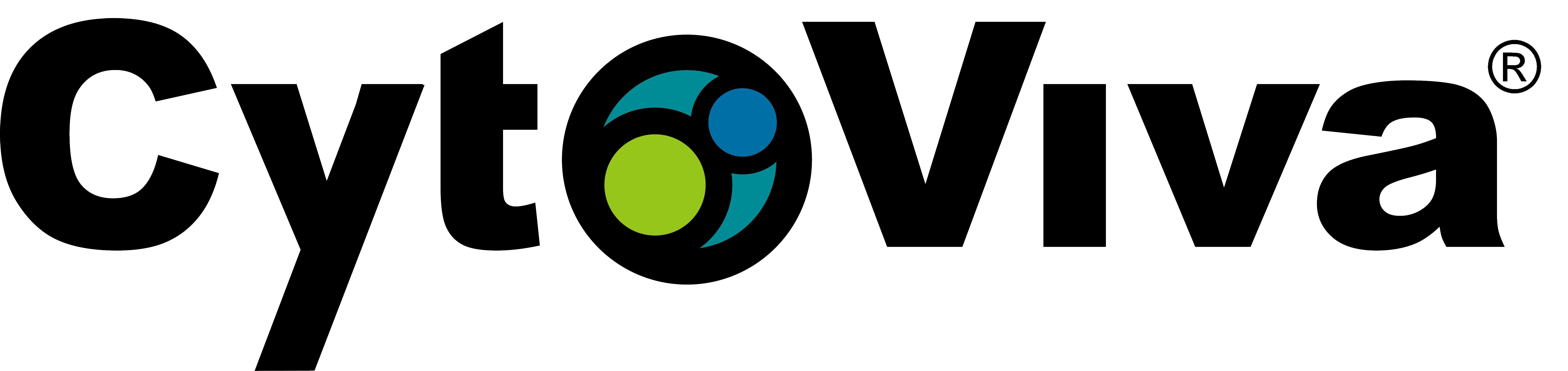
- Type: Corporation
- Industry: Nanotechnology
- Headquarters: Auburn, AL, USA
- Area served: International
- Key people: CEO: Samuel M. Lawrence; COO: John O. Lawrence; VP, Sales & Marketing: Byron J. Cheatham; Technology Development Director: James M. Beach Ph.D
- Website: www.CytoViva.com

CytoViva, Inc. is a scientific imaging and instrumentation company that develops and markets optical microscopy and hyperspectral imaging technology for nanomaterials, pathogen and general biology applications.

== History ==
The company's core optical technology was invented by Vitaly Vodyanoy, Physiology Professor and Director of the Biosensor Laboratory at Auburn University. CytoViva commercialized this technology in 2005 and patents for the illumination optics were issued in 2009 (US patents No. 7,542,203, 7,564,623). In 2008, the company introduced hyperspectral imaging technology as an integrated solution with its patented optical microscopy capability.

The company is currently headquartered in Auburn, Alabama at the Auburn Research Park and has distribution partners worldwide. As of 2016, over 300 research laboratories worldwide utilize CytoViva technology.

== Products ==
CytoViva combines patented enhanced darkfield optical microscopy technology with a proprietary hyperspectral imaging capability. This combination of technologies enables optical observation and spectral characterization of a wide range of nanoscale samples, including nanoparticles, pathogens and subcellular materials.

Products include:

- The patented enhanced darkfield illumination system, which replaces the standard microscope condenser, provides up to 10x improved signal-to-noise optical images of nanoscale samples over standard darkfield microscopy. The system incorporates oblique angle, pre-aligned Kohler illumination. The resulting high signal-to-noise image enables direct observation of nanoscale sample elements.
- The dual mode fluorescence module is a transmitted light fluorescent technique that enables real time observation of both fluorescent and non-fluorescent sample elements. This is accomplished through the proportionate mixing of fluorescence excitation light and full spectrum light.
- The hyperspectral microscope system integrates hyperspectral imaging (HSI) onto the microscope to capture spectral image files. These spectral image files can be used to spectrally characterize sample elements such as nanoparticles, pathogens or subcellular materials. Image analysis software enables mapping sample elements based upon their unique spectral fingerprint. In its most general form, hyperspectral microscopy can be used to determine the location of nanoscale materials within a sample. Analysis methods include identifying and mapping materials in composites, conducting mean spectral analysis, and comparisons of comparable materials.

== Applications ==
- Identifying and mapping Ag, Au and other nanoparticles, in cells, tissue or other composite matrix
- Characterizing drug loads and other functional groups added to nanoparticles
- Confirming the presence of carbon nanotubes in tissue and cells
- Detecting airborne carbon nanotubes and other airborne nanomaterials
- Identifying liposomes used as drug delivery vectors
- Mapping quantum dots and fluorescently tagged particles and subcellular structure
- Bacteria, virus and other pathogen detection
- Plant pathology
- Subcellular structure characterization
- Live cell imaging
