= Institut des nanotechnologies de Lyon =

French research institute

Institut des Nanotechnologies de Lyon (INL) or the Lyon Institute of Nanotechnology is a fundamental and applied research laboratory in the field of micro- and nano-technology based in Lyon, France. Its mission is to conduct research towards the development of full-fledged technologies for a broad range of application sectors (semiconductors and micro-electronics, telecommunication, energy, health, biology, industrial control, defence, environment).

The research programs draw on the resources of the Lyon-based Nanolyon technology platform.

A transversal research operation is specifically dedicated to the development of Nanocharacterization tools and techniques.

The laboratory is situated on the campuses of Ecole Centrale de Lyon, INSA Lyon, University of Lyon 1 and CPE. It comprises 120 permanent staff and approximately 95 non-permanent staff. The annual budget excluding salaries is about 3M€.

The management team is made up of Guy Hollinger (director), G. Guillot (vice-director for the INSA site), P. Morin (vice-director for the UL1 site) and Ian O'Connor (vice-director for the ECL site).

Under the auspices of the CNRS, INL seeks candidates at the CR2 and CR1 levels to contribute to or lead scientific and technological research in the following priority fields:

- Integration of new electronic and photonic functions on Silicon (material, devices and systems issues).
- Sensors, Microsystems and Sensor networks for health
- 3rd generation Photovoltaics
- Bottom up nanotechnologies and nanobiotechnologies.
