= Center for Nanotechnology in Society =

Research and education center

The Center for Nanotechnology in Society at the University of California at Santa Barbara (CNS-UCSB) is funded by the National Science Foundation and "serves as a national research and education center, a network hub among researchers and educators concerned with societal issues concerning nanotechnologies, and a resource base for studying these issues in the US and abroad." The CNS-UCSB began its operations in January 2006.

Nanotechnology (sometimes shortened to nanotech or nano) is the study of manipulating matter on an atomic and molecular scale. Generally, nanotechnology deals with structures sized between 1 and 100 nanometre in at least one dimension, and involves developing materials or devices possessing at least one dimension within that size. Quantum mechanical effects are very important at this scale.

CNS-UCSB looks at the societal implications of nano, including governance, economics, technological development, potential environmental and health risks (risk perception), and "social risks" such as distribution of benefits.

== History ==
The Center received its first five years of funding from the U.S. National Science Foundation. The Center aims to disseminate both its technological and social scientific findings on nanoscale science to policymakers and those outside the nano field, and to facilitate broader public participation in the nanotechnological enterprise. It does this through public engagement between academic researchers with regulators, educators, industrial scientists, and policy makers, as well as community-based organizations and NGOs. The Center’s education and outreach programs include students and people outside the nanotech field.

== Focus ==
The Center has three main areas of research:

1. the historical context of the nano-enterprise;
2. innovation processes and global diffusion of nanotech;
3. risk perception and the public sphere.

== Partnerships ==
CNS–UCSB researchers collaborate with the California NanoSystems Institute, UC Santa Cruz, UC Berkeley, the Science History Institute (formerly the Chemical Heritage Foundation), Duke University, Rice University, SUNY Levin Institute, and SUNY New Paltz in the US, and Cardiff University, UK, University of British Columbia, Canada, University of Edinburgh, UK, University of East Anglia, UK, as well as institutes and centers in China and East Asia.
