= CeNTech =

German research institute

Coordinates: 51°58′09″N 7°35′33″E

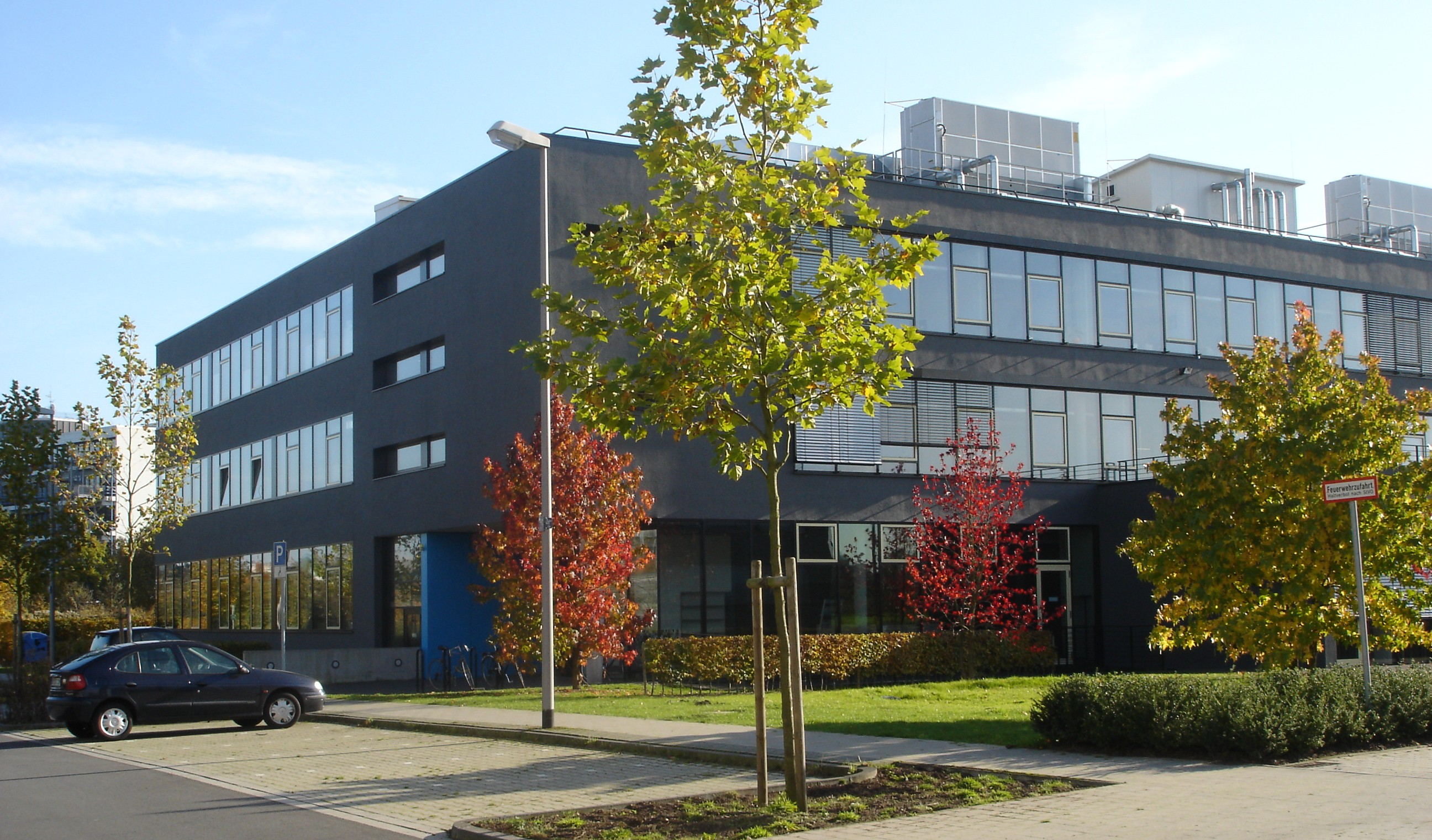
The „Center for Nanotechnology“ (CeNTech) - Gievenbecker Weg

The Center for Nanotechnology is one of the first centers for nanotechnology. It was founded in 2001 and is located in Münster, North Rhine-Westphalia, Germany. It offers many possibilities for research, education, start-ups and companies in nanotechnology. Hence it works together with the University of Münster (WWU), the Max Planck Institute for Molecular Biomedicine and many more research institutions.
