= 4D LABS =

Canadian materials science research institute

Coordinates: 49.27686°N 122.91659°W

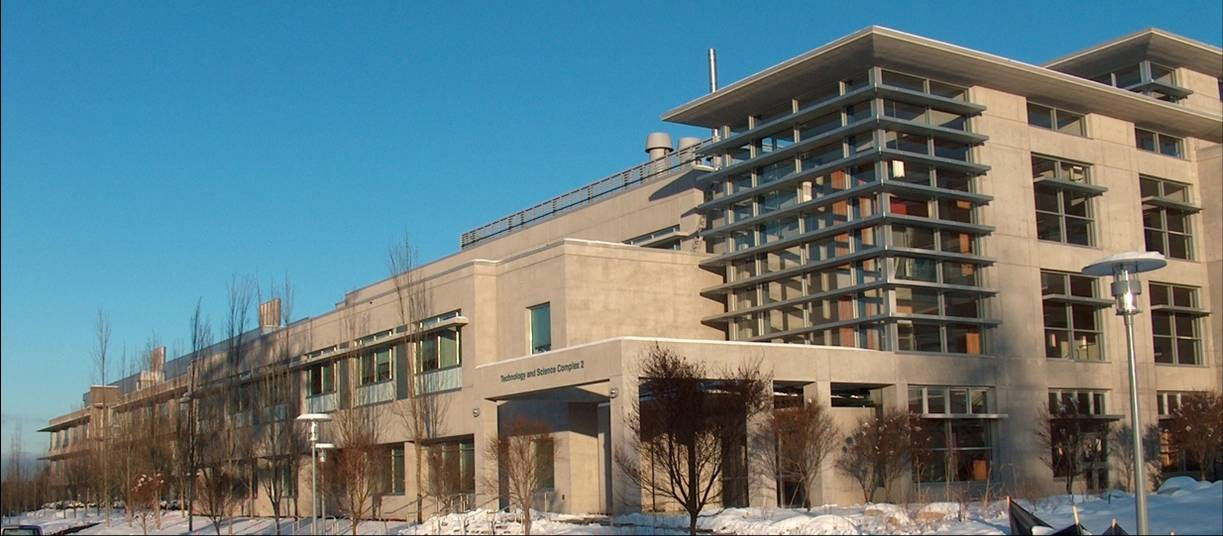
The TASC2 building on the SFU campus

4D LABS is a materials science research institute at Simon Fraser University in British Columbia, Canada that focuses on the design, development, demonstration, and delivery of advanced functional materials and nanoscale devices. Its $41 million facility opened in Jan 2007 with funding from Canada Foundation for Innovation, the British Columbia Knowledge Development Fund, and Simon Fraser University.

4D LABS is located in the Technology and Science Complex 2 (TASC2) building on the Simon Fraser University campus in Burnaby. This research institute houses 4700 sq ft of Class 100 clean room processing space, high resolution microscopy, an advanced spectroscopy and laser laboratory, and a visiting scientists' laboratory. It employs a technical staff to provide users with training and fee-for-hire services in nanofabrication, nanoimaging, and LASIR (Laboratory for Advanced Spectroscopy and Imaging Research). It specializes in the clean energy, information technology, health care, agriculture, and environment sectors.

== History ==
4D LABS was founded in 2005 with funding from the Canada Foundation for Innovation, the BC Knowledge Development Fund and SFU. Its $41 million facility on the Burnaby SFU campus opened in January, 2007. The name 4D LABS is derived from the four D's that define its focus: design, development, demonstration, and delivery of advanced functional materials and nanoscale devices. The purpose of 4D LABS is to accelerate the commercialization of university research in the areas of advanced materials and nanoscale devices. The operating model includes shared laboratories, equipment, and crosses the boundaries of both scientific and engineering disciplines.

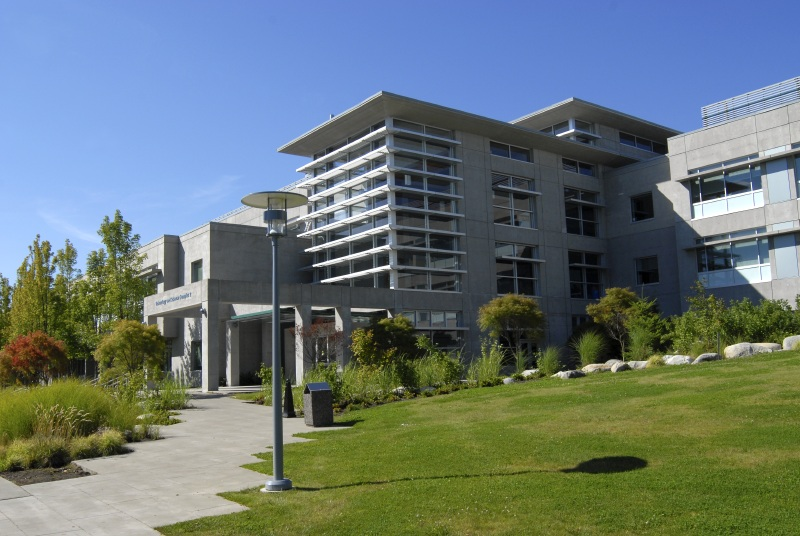
Technology and Science Complex 2(TASC 2), housing major research laboratories and offices.

=== Executive Directors ===
- 2007–present Neil Branda
- 2005-2007 Ross Hill
