= Nile University =

Research and entrepreneurial university in Giza, Egypt

- جامعة النيل; Gāmiʿat al-Nil
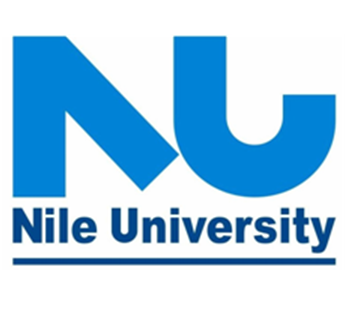
- Other names: NU
- Motto: Learn, Live, Innovate
- Type: First Ahleya, non-governmental & non-profit research and entrepreneurial
- Established: 2006, 20 years ago
- Founders: Tarek Khalil
- President: Wael Akl
- Location: Sheikh Zayed City, Egypt; 30.0105°N 30.9867°E
- Campus: NU Main Campus: 26 July Corridor, Sheikh Zayed City
- Website: www.nu.edu.eg

Nile University (NU) (Arabic: جامعة النيل) is the first non-profit, research and entrepreneurial university in Egypt. Founded in July 2006 with the support of the Egyptian Ministry of Communications and Information Technology. The university has undergraduate programs and graduate programs alongside its research centers.

The university is located in Juhayna Square on 26 July Corridor, Sheikh Zayed, Giza. It includes 5 Schools: School of Engineering and Applied Sciences, School of Information Technology and Computer Science, School of Business Administration, School of Biotechnology, Graduate School of Management of Technology.

== History ==
Nile University (NU) was established in 2006 (Presidential Decree # 255/2006), officially inaugurated in January 2007 and became a non-governmental autonomously managed (Ahleya) university in 2014 (Presidential Decree # 123/2014).

== Schools with undergraduate programs ==
=== School of Engineering and Applied Sciences ===
- Architecture and Urban Design
- Civil and Infrastructure Engineering and Management
- Electronics and Computer Engineering
- Industrial Engineering
- Mechanical Engineering

=== School of Information Technology and Computer Science ===
- Computer Science Program
- Artificial Intelligence Program
- Biomedical Informatics Program
- Cyber security Program

=== School of Business Administration ===
- Economics
- Supply Chain and Logistics
- General Business and Entrepreneurship
- Finance
- Integrated Marketing Communication

=== School of Biotechnology ===
- Applied Biotechnology
- Bioinformatics

== Schools with postgraduate programs ==
=== Graduate School of Management of Technology (MOT) ===
- Ph.D. in Management of Technology
- M.Sc. in Management of Technology
- Diploma in Management of Technology

=== School of Engineering and Applied Sciences (EAS) ===
- Master of Science in Mechatronics Engineering
- Master of Microelectronics System Design

=== School of Business Administration (BA) ===
- Executive Master of Business Administration (EMBA)
- Master of Science and Professional Diploma in Banking and Finance (MBF)
- MBA/EMBA Dual Degree

=== School of Information Technology and Computer Science (ITCS) ===
- Ph.D. in informatics
- Ph.D. in Information Security
- Ph.D. in Software Engineering
- M.Sc. in informatics
- M.Sc. in Information Security
- M.Sc. in Software Engineering
- Bioinformatics Diploma
- Big Data and Data Science Diploma
- Computational Drug Discovery and Development Professional Diploma (C3D)

== Research centers ==
- Smart Engineering Systems Center
- Center for Informatics Science
- Wireless Intelligent Networks Center
- Nano-Electronics Integrated Systems Center
- Innovation, Entrepreneurship and Competitiveness Center
