= Topoisomer =

Topoisomers or topological isomers are molecules with the same chemical formula and stereochemical bond connectivities but different topologies. Examples of molecules for which there exist topoisomers include DNA, which can form knots, and catenanes. Each topoisomer of a given DNA molecule possesses a different linking number associated with it. DNA topoisomers can be interchanged by enzymes called topoisomerases. Using a topoisomerase along with an intercalator, topoisomers with different linking number may be separated on an agarose gel via gel electrophoresis.

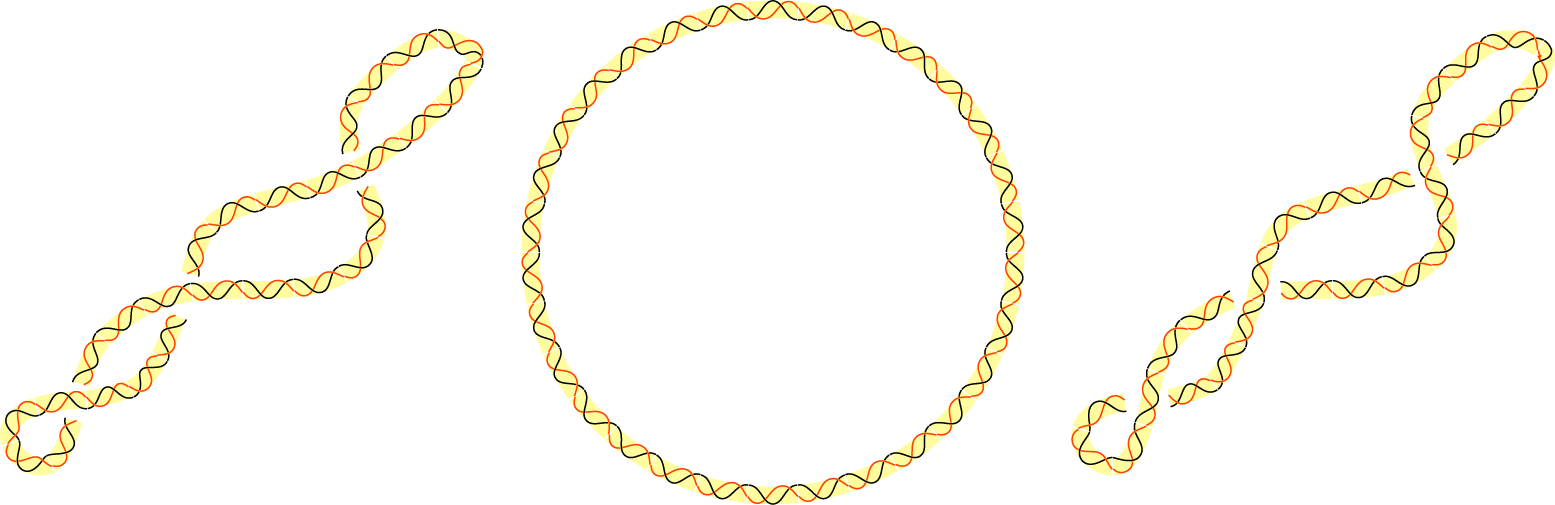
Three topoisomers of a closed circular DNA molecule. Left: negatively supercoiled; center: relaxed; right: positively supercoiled

== See also ==
- Mechanically-interlocked molecular architectures
- Catenane
- Rotaxanes
- Molecular knot
- Molecular Borromean rings
