= Jean-Pierre Sauvage =

French chemist, Nobel laureate (born 1944)

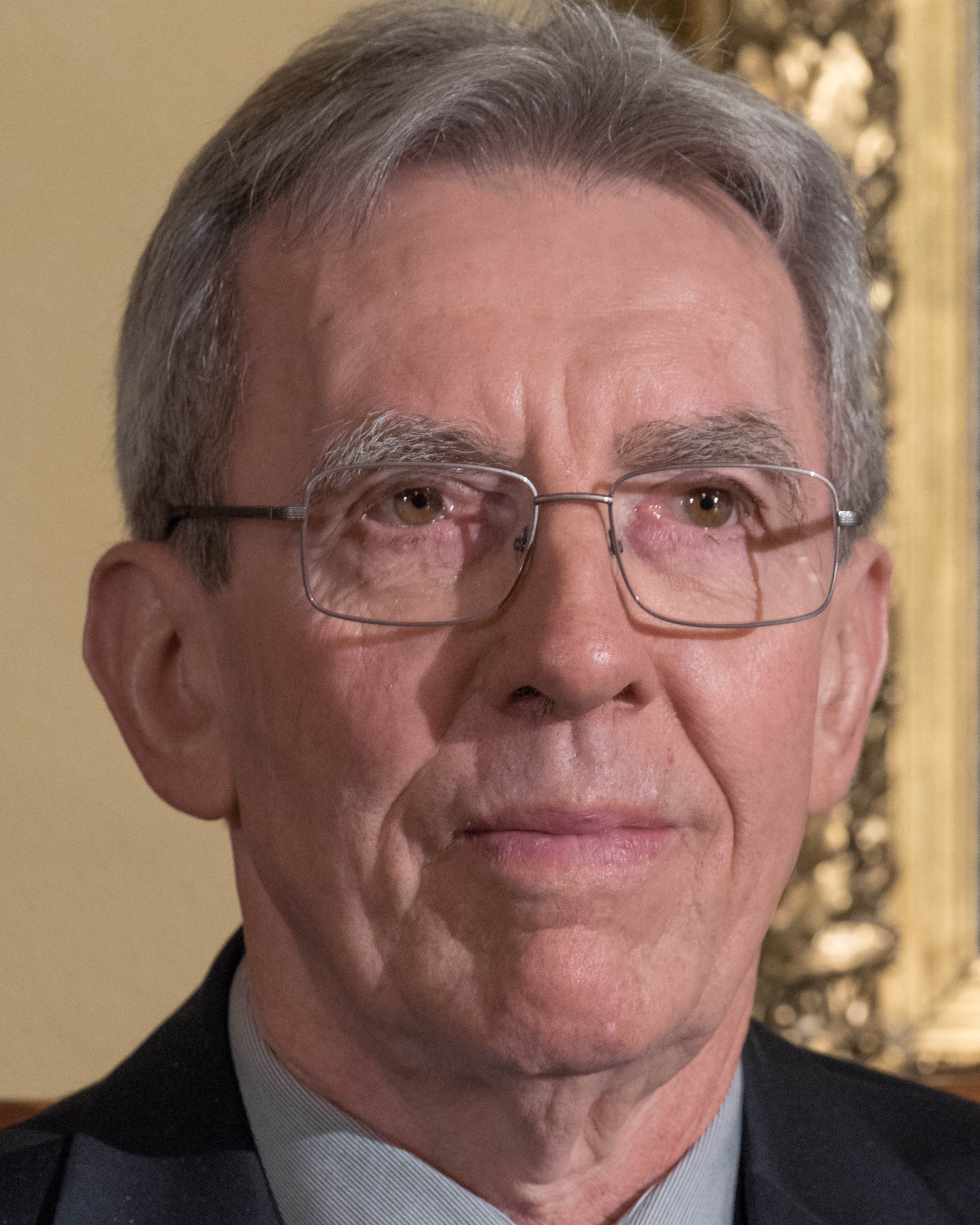
- Sauvage at the Nobel press conference in Stockholm, December 2016
- Born: 21 October 1944 (age 81); Paris, France
- Education: ECPM Strasbourg
- Awards: French Academy of Sciences (1990); Nobel Prize in Chemistry (2016)
- Scientific career
- Fields: Coordination chemistry, supramolecular chemistry
- Workplaces: Strasbourg University
- Thesis: Les Diaza-polyoxa-macrobicycles et leur cryptates (1971)
- Doctoral advisor: Jean-Marie Lehn

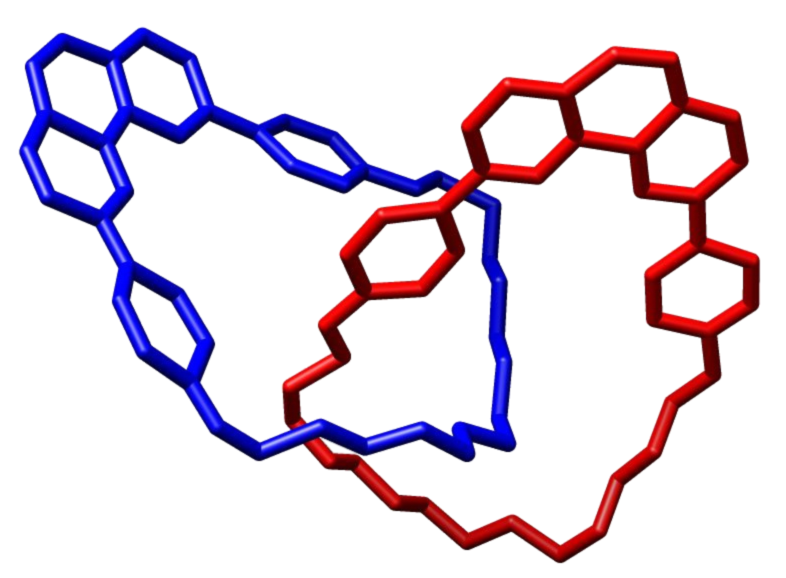
Crystal structure of a catenane reported by Sauvage and coworkers in the Chem. Commun., 1985, 244–247.

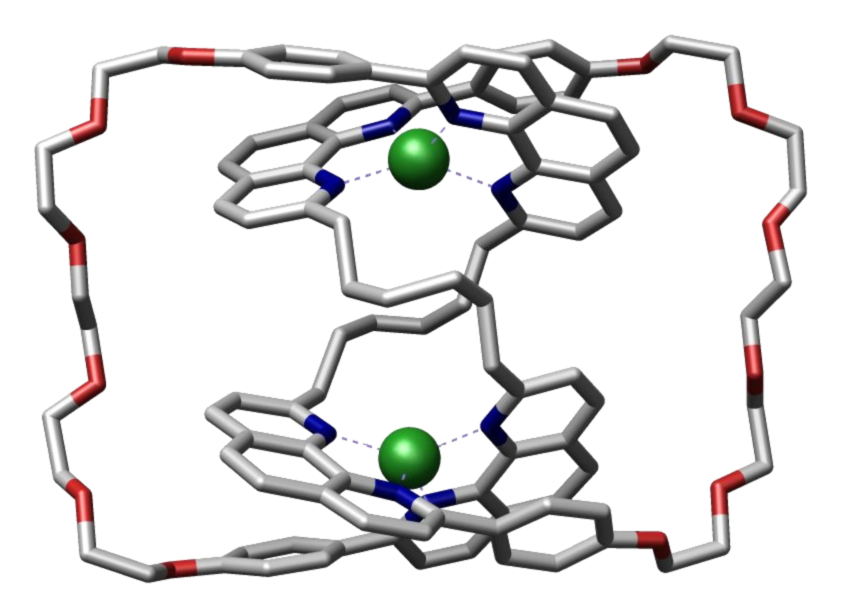
Crystal structure of a molecular trefoil knot with two copper(I) templating ions bound within it reported by Sauvage and coworkers in Recl. Trav. Chim. Pay. B., 1993, 427–428.

Jean-Pierre Sauvage (French pronunciation: [ʒɑ̃pjɛʁ sovaʒ]; born 21 October 1944) is a French coordination chemist working at Strasbourg University. He graduated from the National School of Chemistry of Strasbourg (now known as ECPM Strasbourg), in 1967. He has specialized in supramolecular chemistry for which he has been awarded the 2016 Nobel Prize in Chemistry along with Sir J. Fraser Stoddart and Bernard L. Feringa.

== Biography ==
Sauvage was born in Paris in 1944, and earned his PhD degree from the Université Louis-Pasteur under the supervision of Jean-Marie Lehn, himself a 1987 laureate of the Nobel Prize in Chemistry. During his doctoral work, he contributed to the first syntheses of the cryptand ligands. After postdoctoral research with Malcolm L. H. Green, he returned to Strasbourg, where he is now emeritus professor.

Sauvage's scientific work has focused on creating molecules that mimic the functions of machines by changing their conformation in response to an external signal.

His Nobel Prize work was done in 1983, when he was the first to synthesize a catenane, a complex of two interlocking ring-shaped molecules, which were bonded mechanically rather than chemically. Because these two rings can move relative to each other, the Nobel Prize cited this as a vital initial effort towards making molecular machines. The other two recipients of the prize followed up by later creating a rotaxane and a molecular rotor.

Other research includes electrochemical reduction of CO_{2} and models of the photosynthetic reaction center.

A large theme of his work is molecular topology, specifically mechanically-interlocked molecular architectures. He has described syntheses of catenanes and molecular knots based on coordination complexes.

He was elected a correspondent member of the French Academy of Sciences on 26 March 1990, and became a member on 24 November 1997. He is currently emeritus professor at the University of Strasbourg (Unistra).

He shared the 2016 Nobel Prize in Chemistry "for the design and synthesis of molecular machines" with Sir J. Fraser Stoddart and Bernard L. Feringa. He was elected a foreign associate of the US National Academy of Sciences in April 2019.

As of 2021, Sauvage has an h-index of 109 according to Google Scholar and of 100 according to Scopus.

== Honours ==
- Knight of the Légion d'honneur (1999)
- Grand Officer of the Ordre national du Mérite (2016)
