= Molecular switch =

Molecule with ability to reversibly switch states

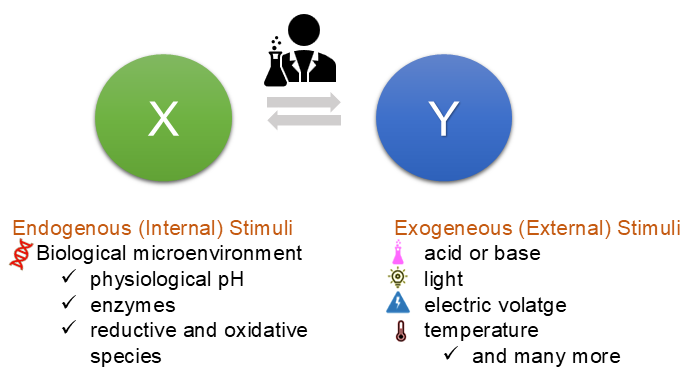
Types of endogenous and exogenous stimuli for molecular switches.

A molecular switch is a molecule that can be switched between two or more stable or metastable states with the use of any external (exogenous) or internal (endogenous) stimuli, such as changes in pH, light, temperature, an electric current, a microenvironment, or in the presence of ions, and other ligands. In some cases, a combination of stimuli is required. Molecular switches are reversible. They have been considered for a wide area of possible applications, but the main uses are in photochromic lenses and windows.

== Biological ==
Biological stimuli are endogenous form of stimuli. This involves variation in the physiological changes around the cells, such as variable pH, presence of oxidative or reductive species, and enzymes. In cellular biology, proteins act as intracellular signaling molecules by activating another protein in a signaling pathway. In order to do this, proteins act as molecular switches by toggling between active and inactive states.

For example, phosphorylation of proteins can be used to activate or inactivate proteins. The external signal flipping the molecular switch could be a protein kinase, which adds a phosphate group to the protein, or a protein phosphatase, which removes phosphate groups. Normal tissues and diseased tissues have different pH, so current approaches of effective drug delivery systems (DDS) include the use of this difference in pH as an endogenous stimulus. Such DDS offer a huge advantage over the conventional therapeutic drug release methods as they selectively release drug cargo at a specific physiological pH. For instance, a study by Shi et al. proposed a pH-responsive/enzyme-cascade-reactive nanoplatform for antibacterial applications. Many artificial nucleic acid-based switches have opened up new opportunities in nucleic-acid nanoscience and RNA/DNA biochemistry.

== Acidochromic ==
The ability of some compounds to change color in function of the pH was known since the sixteenth century. This effect was even known before the development of acid-base theory. Those are found in a wide range of plants like roses, cornflowers, primroses and violets. Robert Boyle was the first person to describe this effect, employing plant juices (in the forms of solution and impregnated paper). This effect is the result of structural or electronic changes in molecules upon interaction with protons and is called acidochromism. Acidochromic molecules are most commonly used as pH indicators such as phenolphthalein, methyl orange, and methyl red. Their acidic and basic forms have different colors. When an acid or a base is added, the equilibrium between the two forms is displaced.

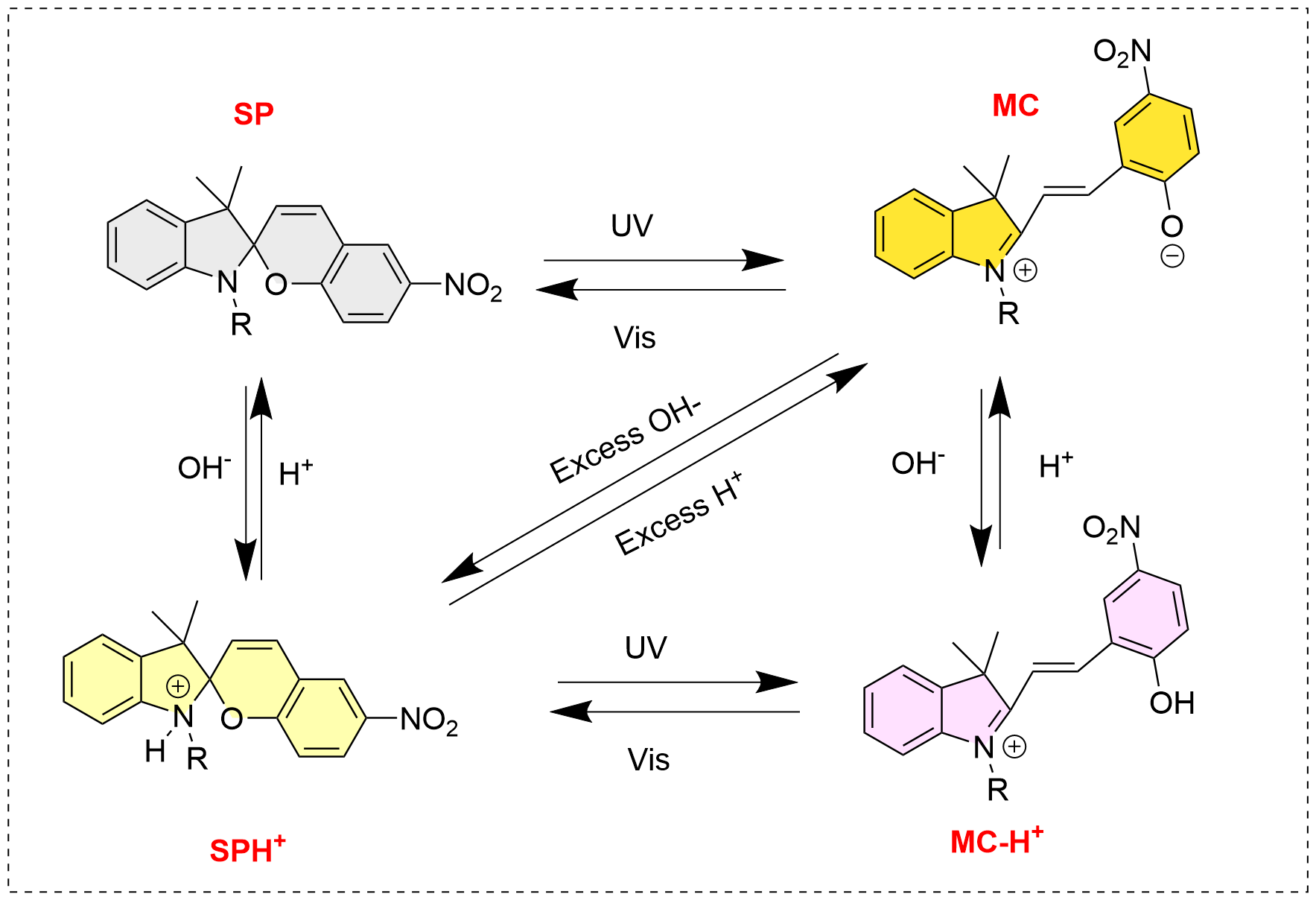
The dual responsive behavior of spiropyran

Examples in the literature of molecular switches with reversible pH response are spiropyran, hydrazones, Donor-Acceptor-Steenhouse Aduucts (DASA), heptamethine–oxonol dyes, etc.

Spiropyran, SP changes its color from blue in the presence of acid such as TFA (trifluroacetic acid) to colorless ring opened form called merocyanine, MC while under alkaline conditions reverts it back to the ring closed, SP form. They are called dual responsive switches since light can also be used to trigger the isomerization. There mechanism of isomerization is shown in the figure above. Due to their easy synthesis and excellent optical stability, they are widely used in bioimaging and pH sensing.

An interesting example of pH-responsive molecular switches is shown by Yin's group, who developed pH sensors made up of the spiropyran-based fluorescent probe that can be used for precise and rapid pH detection by making their pH paper strips. Their probe also incorporates indole salts as nucleophilic addition sites that react with OH^{−} ions (hydroxide ions) in different pH environments. A 2022 report by Wang et al. shows the spiropyran-based cellulose nanocrystals useful for pH sensors.

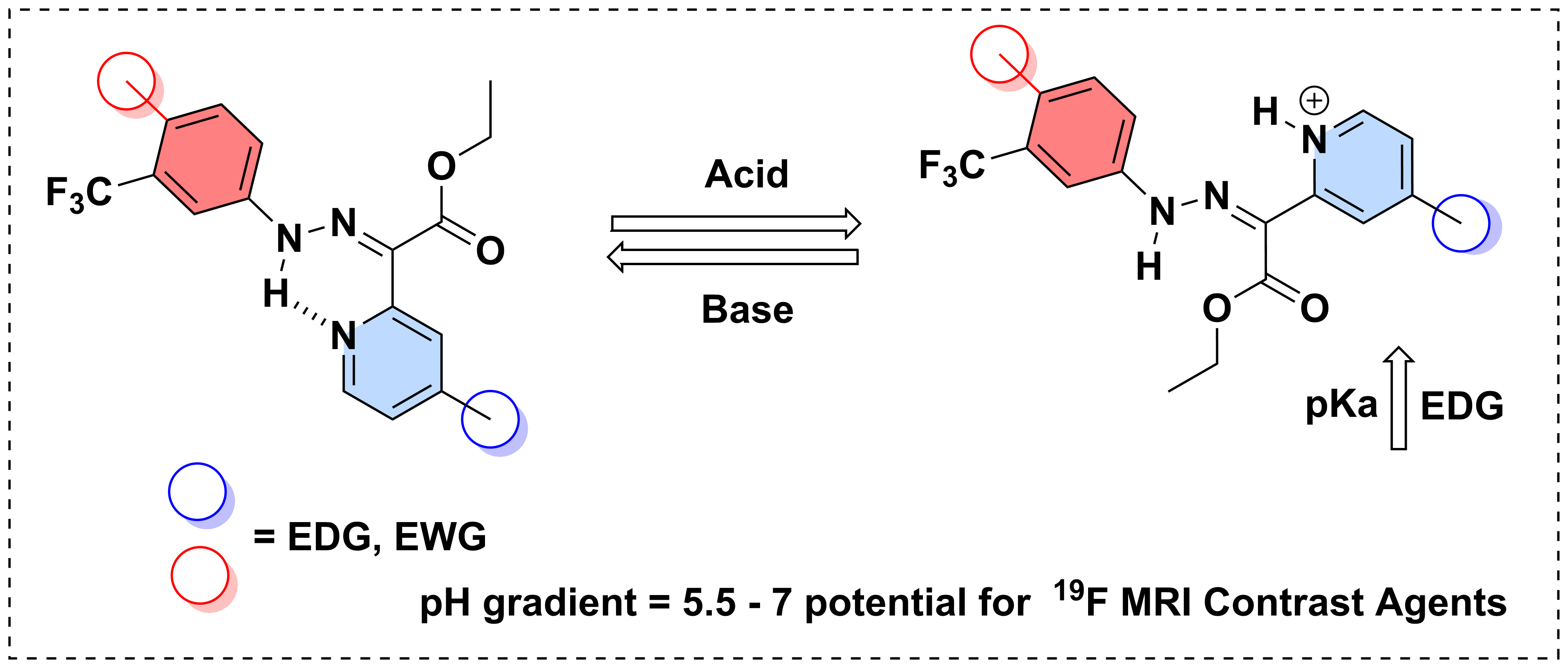
pH responsive Hydrazone switches having potential for 19F MRI Contrast agent. Picture shows the structural change in the hydrazone molecule by acid or base.

Acidochromic behavior of hydrazones (C=N-N-) is attributed to their tautomerization under an acidic or basic conditions. This linkage is useful in drug delivery (DDS) due to their faster hydrolysis rate in an acidic environment.

Acid can also help to tune the physical state of the switch. In 2022, Quintard and coworkers have shown the sol- gel transition of various amines using trichloroacetic acid (TCA) as fuel to create new types of time-controlled smart materials.

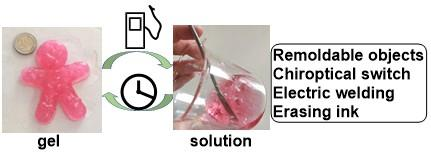
The sol-gel transition of acid sensitive amines using trichloroacetic acid (TCA)

== Photochromic ==
Azobenzene	The photochromic trans-cis (E/Z) isomerization of azobenzenes has been widely utilized in molecular switches. Upon isomerization, azobenzenes undergo changes in physical properties, including molecular geometry, absorption spectra, and dipole moment. These property changes enable azobenzenes to be used in various applications. In particular, azobenzenes incorporated into crown ethers give switchable receptors and azobenzenes in monolayers can provide light-controlled changes in surface properties.
Diarylethenes	Diarylethenes undergo a fully reversible transformation between their ring-open and ring-closed isomeric forms when exposed to light of different wavelengths. Diarylethene-based photoswitches exhibit high photofatigue resistance, enabling them to undergo numerous photoswitching cycles with minimal degradation. These compounds are also recognized in the development of long-lasting photochemical memory devices due to the thermal stability of both photoforms of diarylethenes.
Spiropyrans and spirooxazines	Spiropyrans, among the oldest photochromic compounds, are closely related to spirooxazines. After irradiation with UV light, the ring opens, forming a conjugated system capable of absorbing visible light, which gives the molecule a colorful appearance. When the UV source is removed, the molecules gradually relax to their ground state, the carbon-oxygen bond reforms, and the molecule returns to its colorless state. This class of photochromes, in particular, is thermodynamically unstable in one form and revert to the stable form in the dark unless cooled to low temperatures.
Fulgides and Fulgimides	Similar to diarylethenes, the photochromic behavior of fulgides and fulgimides is based on 6π-electrocyclic ring-opening and ring-closing reactions. They are highly photochromic photoswitches and reversibly interconvert between two isomeric forms when exposed to light of different wavelengths. These compounds exhibit low photochemical fatigue, high thermal stability, as well as high conversion yields.

The molecules that isomerize when exposed to light of suitable wavelength are called photoswitches. Members of this class include azobenzenes, diarylethenes, dithienylethenes, fulgides, stilbenes, norbornadiene, spiropyrans, hydrazones, indigoids, diazocines, and phenoxynaphthacene quinones.

The inspiration to study light-sensitive switches came from an understanding of retinal. In the dark, retinal exists primarily in an all-trans configuration, except for a cis bond at C-11. Upon exposure to light, it undergoes photoisomerization to an all-trans configuration.

Photo-induced structural, physical, or chemical changes can involve isomerization of bonds (cis ↔ trans), electron transfer, proton transfer in the excited state, ring opening and closing mechanism. These isomerizations affect optical properties. For example, the absorption maximum of (Z)-azobenzene is blue shifted with respect to (E)-azobenzene.

Many light-driven azo-based switches have been investigated.

=== Chiroptical ===
Chiroptical molecular switches are a specific subgroup with photochemical switching taking place between enantiomers. In these compounds the "readout" is by circular dichroism. Hindered alkenes can change their helicity (see: planar chirality) as response to irradiation with right or left-handed circularly polarized light. Chiroptical molecular switches that show directional motion are considered synthetic molecular motors. When attached to the end of a helical poly (isocyanate) polymer, they can switch the helical sense of the polymer.

== Redox active ==
Species that exist in more than oneredox state are potential switches. When the optical properties of the redox state differ, then redox is sometimes called electrochromism. For instance, Ferrocene, which is orange, oxidizes to the blue ferrocenium cation.

Many fluorescence based sensors are based on redox couple mechanism of switches which in their oxidized form quenches the fluorescence of fluorophore while in reduced state does not, or vice versa. Some other examples include, biindeno[2,1-b]thiophenylidene (BTP), viologens, napthelene diimides, bipyridinium, and metal-ligand redox complex.

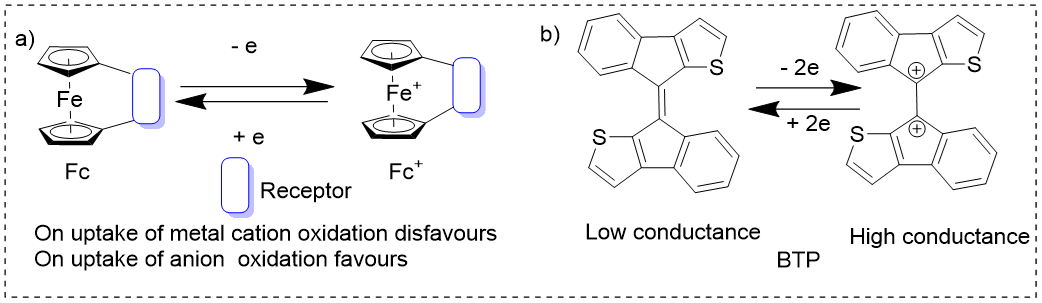
Example of (a) Ferrocene and (b) biindeno[2,1-b]thiophenylidene (BTP) redox active molecular switches.

The first electrochemical sensors for selective binding of metal cations were designed using ferrocene. Because of the high electrostatic repulsion metal cation (taken up by the receptor), the oxidation of ferrocene (Fc to Fc^{+}) becomes difficult while this becomes more easier with anion uptake since it has negative charge to stabilize the system by attractive interactions, hence shifts the redox potential of Fc cathodically i.e., towards less positive direction. Thus, different redox properties of Fc help to do the selective binding of ions. Further, biindeno[2,1-b]thiophenylidene on oxidation converts from the neutral to charged form which leads to the increase in the conductivity of the molecule and hence, they are used as actuators or dopants to modify the surface properties of polymers or nanomaterials.

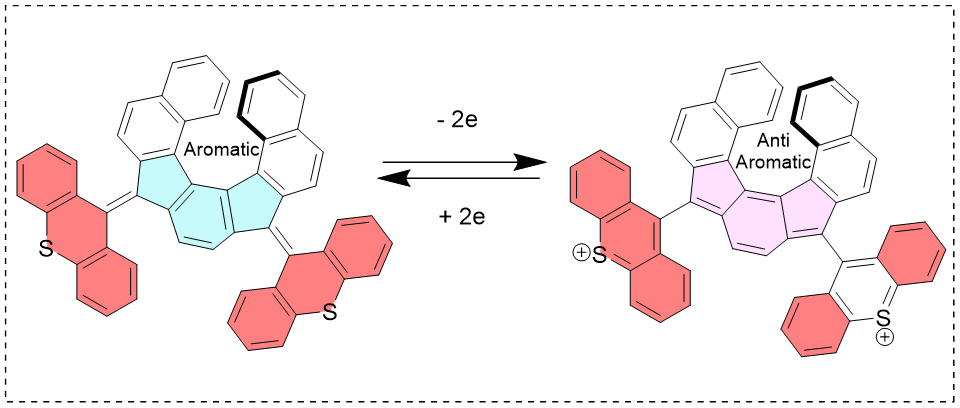
Redox active indenofluorene-bridged bisthioxanthylidene molecular switch

In 2024, Prof. Ben Feringa and his group reported a helicene featuring an indenofluorene-bridged bisthioxanthylidene as a novel switch that undergoes a two-electron redox process allowing it to modulate its (anti)aromatic character reversibly.

== Thermal Molecular switches ==
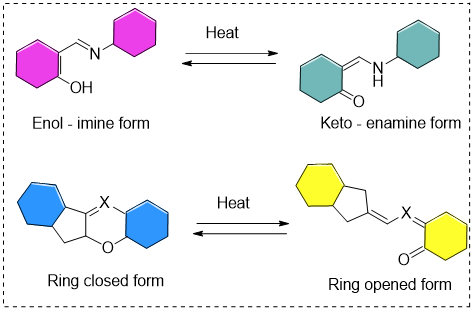
Example: (Top) Schiff Base undergoes intramolecular enol-imine form and keto-enamine tautomerization; (bottom)Tautomeric ring-opening equilibrium exits in spiro compounds through extended conjugation and resonance, yielding electronic transitions which fall in the visible region of the electronic spectrum.

In thermal molecular switches, conformational or structural change is induced by the temperature. The mechanism responsible for thermochromic behavior is the gain of planarity in overcrowded alkenes, keto-enol tautomerization, a change in the crystalline structure (mainly found in inorganic materials such as change of octahedral crystal structure to tetrahedral), the formation of free radicals, and ring-opening reactions. Some molecules show reversible color change when they are heated or cooled respectively. Examples of thermochromic organic molecules include crowded ethenes (e.g., bianthrone and dixanthylene), schiff bases, and spiro compounds.

In 1999, the first example of thermochromic dye was published, in which 2,6-diphenyl-4-(2,4,6-triphenylpyridinio)phenolate (DTPP) and an indicator dye, Cresol Red embedded in a polymer gel network, are shown to exhibit an outstanding thermochromism. The contrasting thermal response of RNA and DNA at variable temperatures is an interesting phenomenon. Tashiro et al. (2005) made a biomolecular device using this property of DNA and RNA. They attached a fluorophore (2-aminopurene) to both DNA and RNA strands. The fluorescence signal of the fluorophore was turned "on" to "off" as the temperature changed from low to high for the DNA device and vice versa for the RNA device. Hence, successfully made reversible, thermoresponsive RNA- and DNA-based devices.

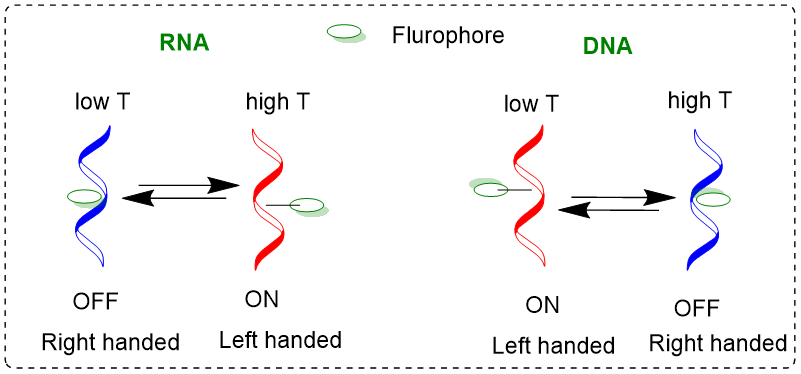
Schematic representation of RNA and DNA reversible biomolecular devices that respond inversely to thermal stimuli.

In 2011, Feng et al. reported a temperature-sensitive fluorescent triarylboron thermometer that shows high quantum yield and color change at a wide variety of temperatures. Leuco dye (LD)-based thermochromic (TC) materials have been widely applied in energy storage, sensors, and optical memory storage. A recent report in 2022 by Fei et al. demonstrated a four-input signal based optically controlled thermochromic switch. Azobenzene derivatives were used to lock the color developer and leuco dye at the required temperature.

== Supramolecular switches ==
=== Host-Guest ===
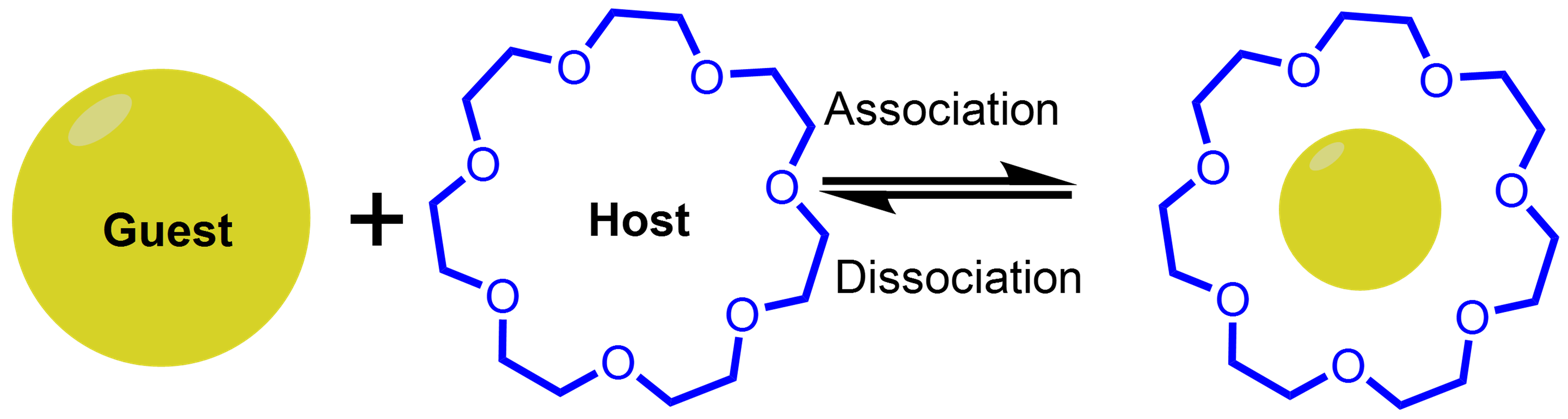
Schematic representation of Host-guest complex showing association and dissociation of the guest molecule from host which is crown ether here.

The first photochemical synthesis of crown ether via photochemical anthracene dimerization is described in 1978 by Desvergne & Bouas-Laurent. Although not strictly speaking switchable, the compound is able to take up cations after a photochemical trigger; reverse was not possible with light. Solvent (acetonitrile) gives back the open form.

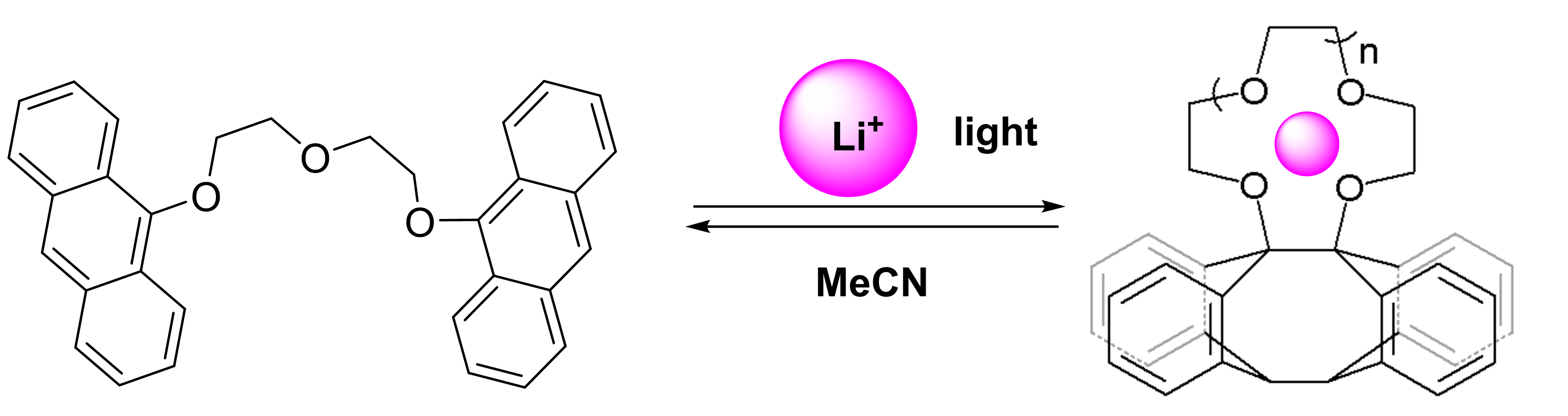
Preparation of a Crown-ether by Photocycloisomerization (Desvergne & Bouas-Laurent

Anthracene groups serve as photo-antennae can control the conformations of crown ethers, which in turn control their chemical reactivity. Upon absorption of light, they cab trigger trans-cis isomerization of the azo group, which resulted in ring expansion. Thus, in the trans orm the crown binds preferentially to ammonium, lithium, and sodium ions, while in the cis form the preference is for potassium and rubidium (both larger ions in the same alkali metal group). In the dark, the reverse isomerization takes place. This device concept mimics the biochemical action of monensin and nigericin: in a biphasic system, ions are taken up, triggered by light in one phase and deposited in the other phase in the absence of light.

Apart from the solution phase modulation of interactions among host and guest molecules, solid phase interactions for their practical applications in functional devices have also been explored. Host materials embedded on nanomaterials showed better surface activity and sensing capabilities, enabling applications in nanotechnology, biology, environmental, and energy technologies.

=== Mechanically-interlocked ===
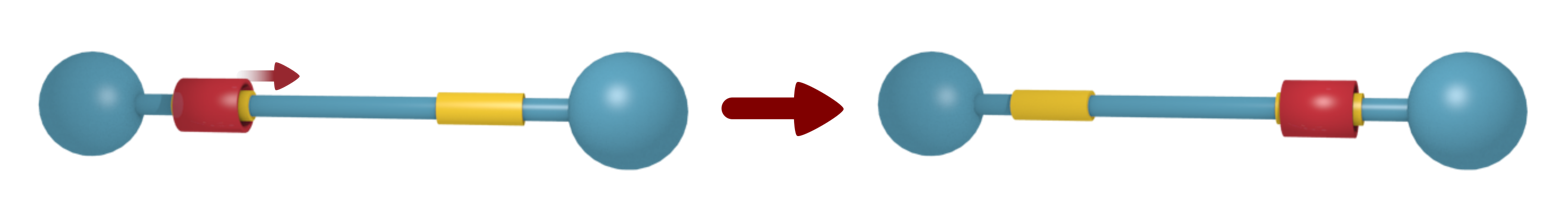
Schematic representation of rotaxane based molecular shuttle showing the shuttle in red color which switches its position with external stimuli

Some of the most advanced molecular switches are based on mechanically-interlocked molecular architectures where the bistable states differ in the position of the macrocycle. These systems enable dynamic and reversible switching between different states in response to external stimuli like light, pH, redox processes, or mechanical force because they are made up of several molecular components that are spatially entangled but not covalently bound. Also, they provide better stability to the system by interlocking the guest molecules at the specific site, as compared to free unprotected guest in host guest molecular switches.

In 1991, Stoddart devised a molecular shuttle based on a rotaxane on which a molecular bead was able to shuttle between two docking stations situated on a molecular thread. Stoddart predicted that when the stations are dissimilar with each of the stations addressed by a different external stimulus the shuttle becomes a molecular machine. In 1993, Stoddart was scooped by supramolecular chemistry pioneer Fritz Vögtle who actually delivered a switchable molecule based not on a rotaxane but on a related catenane.

Photo switchable catenane Vögtle 1993	Molecular switch Kaifer and Stoddart 1994
Photo switchable catenane Vögtle 1993	Molecular switch Kaifer and Stoddart 1994

This compound is based on two ring systems: one ring holds the photoswichable azobenzene ring and two paraquat docking stations and the other ring is a polyether with to arene rings with binding affinity for the paraquat units. In this system NMR spectroscopy shows that in the azo trans-form the polyether ring is free to rotate around its partner ring but then when a light trigger activates the cis azo form this rotation mode is stopped.

Molecular shuttles were utilized in an experimental DRAM circuit. The device consists of 400 bottom silicon nanowire electrodes (16 nanometer (nm) wide at 33 nm intervals) crossed by another 400 titanium top-nanowires with similar dimensions sandwiching a monolayer of a bistable rotaxane depicted below:

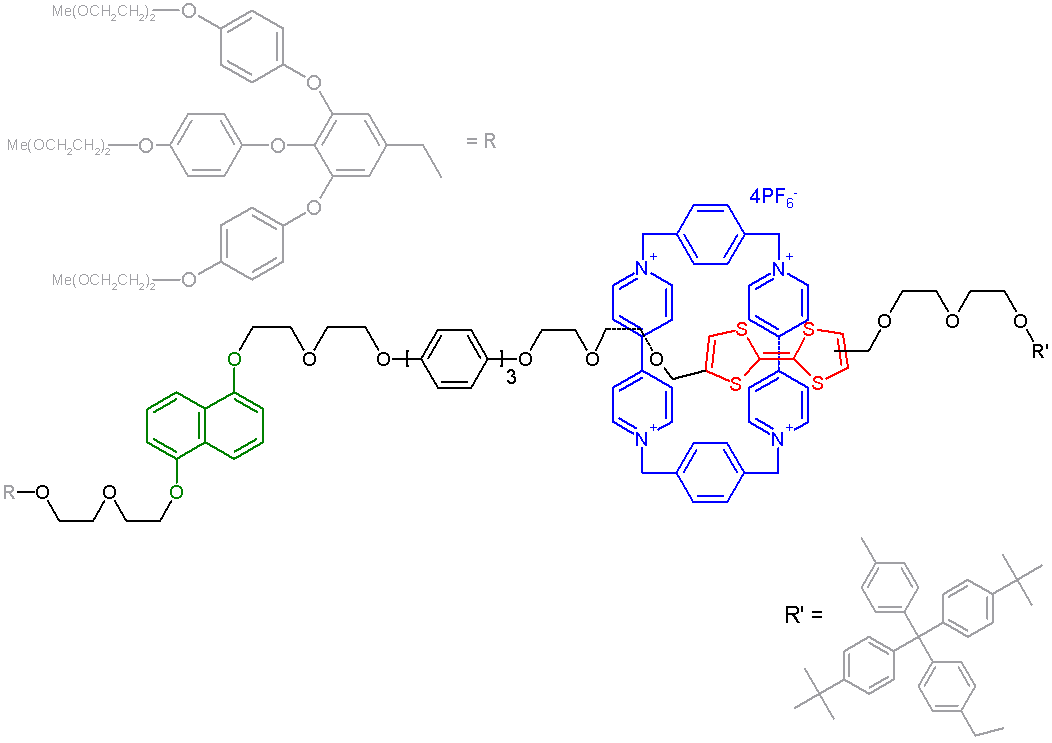
Molecular switch in electronic memory

The hydrophilic diethylene glycol stopper on the left (gray) is specifically designed to anchor to the silicon wire (made hydrophilic by phosphorus doping) while the hydrophobic tetraarylmethane stopper on the right does the same to the likewise hydrophobic titanium wire. In the ground state of the switch, the paraquat ring is located around a tetrathiafulvalene unit (in red) but it moves to the dioxynaphthyl unit (in green) when the fulvalene unit is oxidized by application of a current. When the fulvalene is reduced back a metastable high conductance '1' state is formed which relaxes back to the ground state with a chemical half-life of around one hour. The problem of defects is circumvented by adopting a defect-tolerant architecture also found in the Teramac project. In this way a circuit is obtained consisting of 160,000 bits on an area the size of a white blood cell translating into 10^{11} bits per square centimeter.
