= Olympic gel =

Comparison of the network structures of a classical polymer gel and an Olympic gel.

An Olympic gel is a type of material made of polymer molecules that are connected like the rings in the Olympic symbol. Each pair of linked molecules forms a catenane, and Olympic gels may be considered a type of mechanically interlocked molecular architecture. The name and concept originate with the work of Pierre-Gilles de Gennes, and an illustration of an Olympic gel appears on the cover of certain editions of his book Scaling Concepts in Polymer Physics. They are initially of interest to the materials physics community due to their predicted nonlinear elasticity, stretching differently than a Hookean material with different behavior at low and high forces.

The existence of enzymes that can modify the topology of DNA allows the construction of Olympic gels from DNA in various ways. One method uses Topoisomerase II to form links between circular molecules such as plasmids, which in high enough density allows the formation of an Olympic gel. Another method uses Watson-Crick base pairing with complementary sequences on opposite ends of linear DNA molecules. If there are enough unique sequences of DNA in a sample, molecules are more likely to form loops than concatemers, and after ligation an Olympic gel can be formed.

Naturally occurring Olympic gels are found in kinetoplast DNA in the mitochondria of trypanosome parasites. Kinetoplasts consist of thousands of linked DNA circular DNA molecules, in which smaller molecules are transcribed into RNA molecules that can edit the RNA transcribed from mitochondrial DNA.

There have been reports of synthetic Olympic gels created from hydroxyethyl lipoate.
