= YchF-GTPase C terminal protein domain =

Protein domain

C terminal domain of YchF-GTPase
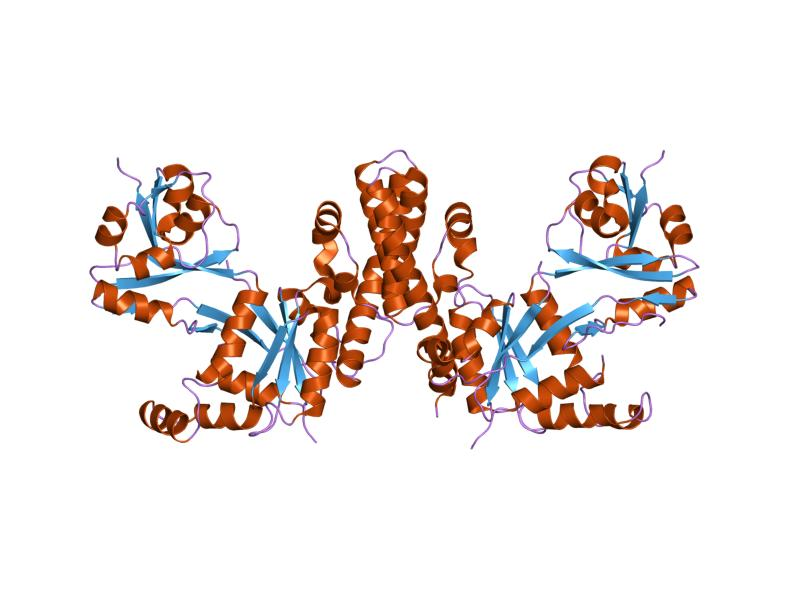
- ychf protein (hi0393)

Identifiers
- Symbol: YchF-GTPase_C
- Pfam: PF06071
- Pfam clan: CL0072
- InterPro: IPR013029
- SCOP2: 1ni3 / SCOPe / SUPFAM
- CDD: cd04867
Available protein structures:
- Pfam: structures / ECOD
- PDB: RCSB PDB; PDBe; PDBj
- PDBsum: structure summary

In molecular biology, this protein domain is found at the C terminus of the GTP-binding protein, YchF-GTPase found in both prokaryotes and eukaryotes.

== Function ==
The function of this protein domain remains unknown, however, it is putatively thought to be necessary for ribosome function or for signal transduction from the ribosome to downstream targets. Additionally, GTPases are often described as a molecular switch.

== Structure ==
The crystal structure of Haemophilus influenzae has been determined. This protein consists of three domains, of which the C-terminal domain which is composed of a six-stranded half-barrel curved around an alpha helix.
