= Narayanaswamy Jayaraman =

Indian chemist

- Born: 25 May 1964 (age 62); Tamil Nadu, India
- Education: Annamalai University; University of Birmingham University of California, Los Angeles
- Known for: Studies on Dendrimers and Carbohydrates
- Awards: 2008 CRSI Silver Medal; 2009 Shanti Swarup Bhatnagar Prize; 2011 Goyal Prize
- Scientific career
- Fields: Organic chemistry; Dendrimer chemistry; Polydiacetylenes; Carbohydrate-protein interactions
- Workplaces: Indian Institute of Science
- Doctoral advisor: Subramania Ranganathan; Fraser Stoddart
- Website: njiisc.in

Narayanaswamy Jayaraman (born 25 May 1964) is an Indian organic chemist and a professor and the chair of the department of organic chemistry at the Indian Institute of Science. He is known for his work on synthesis of complex carbohydrates and new dendrimers and is an elected fellow of the Indian Academy of Sciences. The Council of Scientific and Industrial Research, the apex agency of the Government of India for scientific research, awarded him the Shanti Swarup Bhatnagar Prize for Science and Technology, one of the highest Indian science awards, in 2009, for his contributions to chemical sciences.

== Biography ==
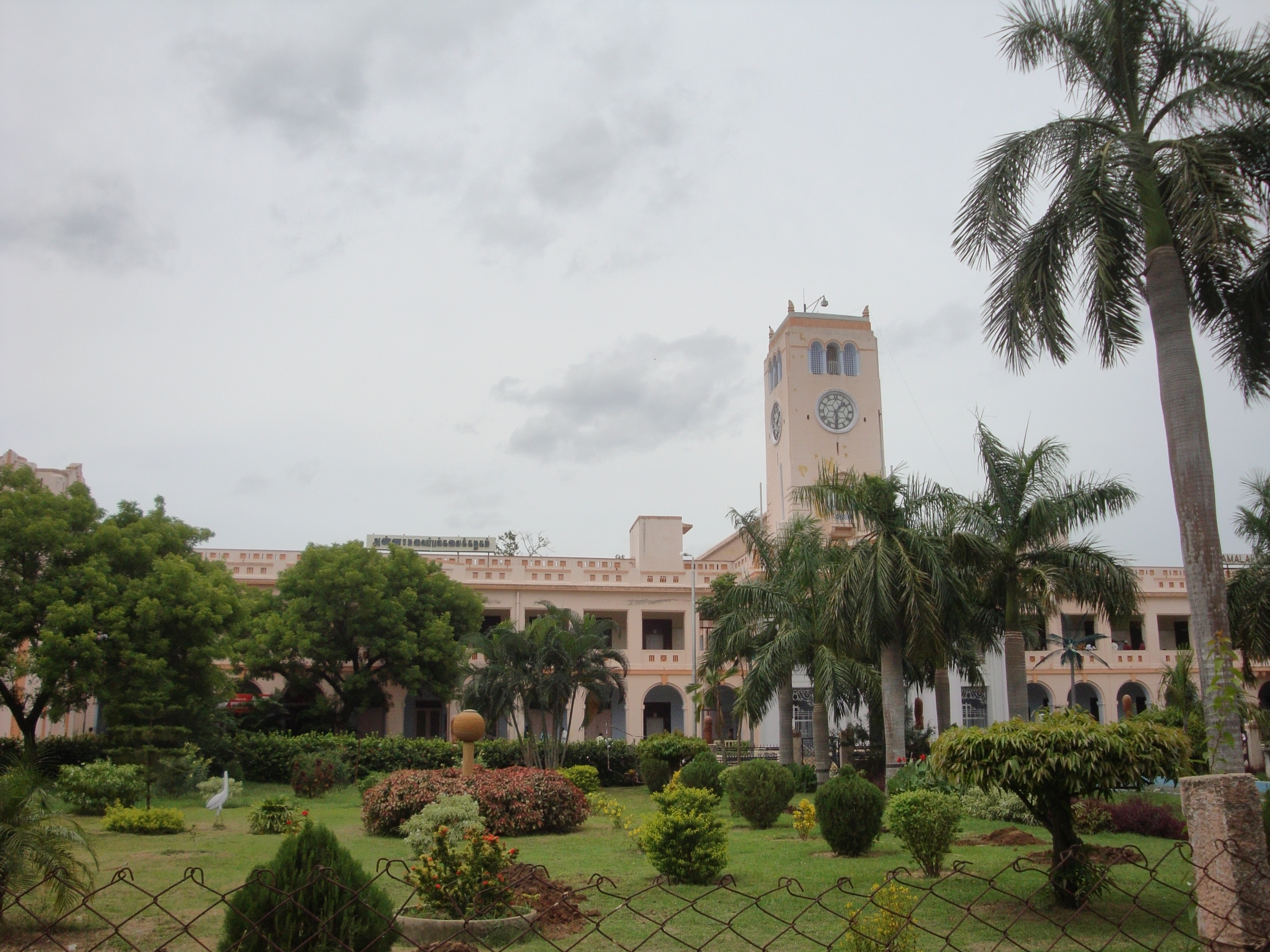
Annamalai University

N. Jayaraman, Born on 25 May 1964 in the south Indian state of Tamil Nadu, did his master's studies in chemistry at Annamalai University and after the completion of the course in 1988, he enrolled for his doctoral studies under the guidance of S. Ranganathan to secure a PhD in 1994. His post-doctoral work was at University of Birmingham during 1994–97 and later at the laboratory of James Fraser Stoddart, the 2016 Nobel laureate in Chemistry, at the University of California, Los Angeles during 1997–99. Returning to India, he joined the premiere Indian Institute of Science where he serves as a professor and the chair of the department of organic chemistry

== Legacy ==
Jayaraman's researches are primarily focused on dendrimers and carbohydrates. He is known to have done extensive work on the synthesis of complex carbohydrates and developed new system of dendrimers. He has also worked on carbohydrate-protein interactions using designer glycolipids as well as on monosaccharides, cluster glycosides, oligosaccharides and unnatural sugars. He is also credited with the identification of poly(alkyl aryl ether) dendrimers and poly(propyl ether imine) dendrimers, two new classes of dendrimers. He has documented his researches in several peer-reviewed articles; ResearchGate an online repository of scientific articles has listed 176 of them. He has also mentored a number of scholars in their doctoral and post-doctoral studies.

== Awards and honors ==
Jayaraman received the Bronze Medal of the Chemical Research Society of India (CRSI) in 2007 and the Council of Scientific and Industrial Research awarded him the Shanti Swarup Bhatnagar Prize, one of the highest Indian science awards, in 2009. In between, he was selected for the Diamond Jubilee Fellowship of the Institute of Chemical Technology in 2008. He received the Goyal Prize in 2011, the same year as he was elected as a fellow by the Indian Academy of Sciences. He has delivered a number of award orations including the Professor Swaminathan Endowment Lecture of the University of Madras in 2007.

== See also ==
- Fraser Stoddart
- Dendrimer
