= Field Programmable Nanowire Interconnect =

Field Programmable Nanowire Interconnect (often abbreviated FPNI) is a new computer architecture developed by Hewlett-Packard. This is a defect-tolerant architecture, using the results of the Teramac experiment.

== Technology ==
The design combines a nanoscale crossbar switch structure with conventional CMOS to create a hybrid chip that is simpler to fabricate and offers greater flexibility in the choice of nanoscale devices. The FPNI improves on a field-programmable gate array (FPGA) architecture by lifting the configuration bit and associated components out of the semiconductor plane and replacing them in the interconnect with nonvolatile switches, which decreases both the area and power consumption of the circuit – while providing up to eight times the density at less cost. This is an example of a more comprehensive strategy for improving the efficiency of existing semiconductor technology: placing a level of intelligence and configurability in the interconnect can have a profound effect on integrated circuit performance, and can be used to significantly extend Moore's Law without having to shrink the transistors.
