= Molecular knot =

Molecule whose structure resembles a knot

In chemistry, a molecular knot is a mechanically interlocked molecular architecture that is analogous to a macroscopic knot. Naturally-forming molecular knots are found in organic molecules like DNA, RNA, and proteins. It is not certain that naturally occurring knots are evolutionarily advantageous to nucleic acids or proteins, though knotting is thought to play a role in the structure, stability, and function of knotted biological molecules. The mechanism by which knots naturally form in molecules, and the mechanism by which a molecule is stabilized or improved by knotting, is ambiguous. The study of molecular knots involves the formation and applications of both naturally occurring and chemically synthesized molecular knots. Applying chemical topology and knot theory to molecular knots allows biologists to better understand the structures and synthesis of knotted organic molecules.

The term knotane was coined by Vögtle et al. in 2000 to describe molecular knots by analogy with rotaxanes and catenanes, which are other mechanically interlocked molecular architectures. The term has not been broadly adopted by chemists and has not been adopted by IUPAC.

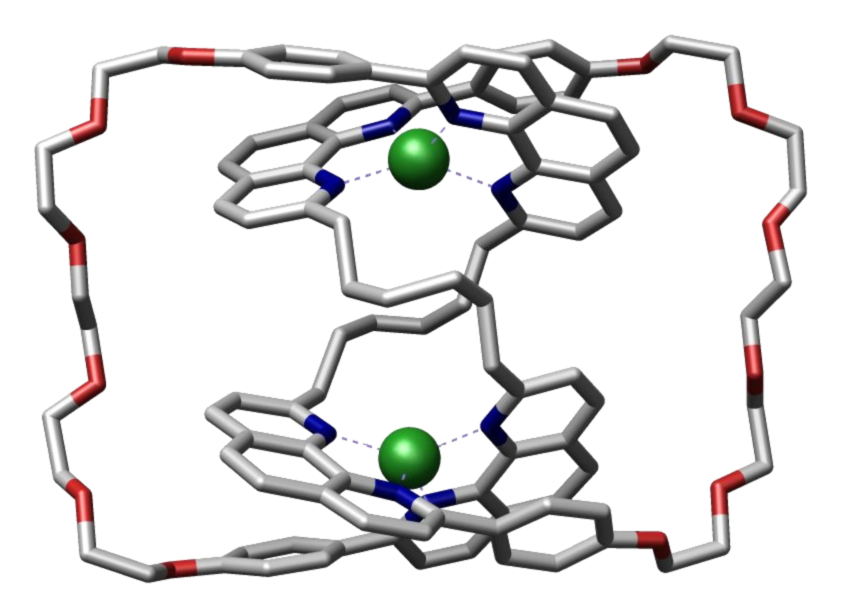
Crystal structure of a molecular trefoil knot with two copper(I) templating ions bound within it reported by Jean Pierre Sauvage and coworkers

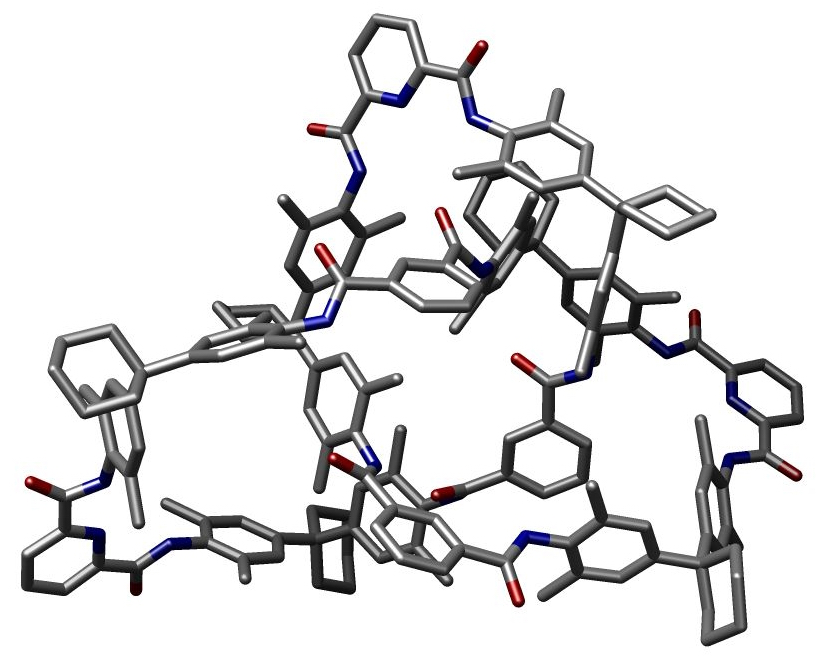
Crystal structure of a molecular trefoil knot reported by Vögtle and coworkers in the Angew. Chem. Int. Ed., 2000, 1616–1618.

== Naturally occurring molecular knots ==
Organic molecules containing knots may fall into the categories of slipknots or pseudo-knots. They are not considered mathematical knots because they are not a closed curve, but rather a knot that exists within an otherwise linear chain, with termini at each end. Knotted proteins are thought to form molecular knots during their tertiary structure folding process, and knotted nucleic acids generally form molecular knots during genomic replication and transcription, though details of knotting mechanism continue to be disputed and ambiguous. Molecular simulations are fundamental to the research on molecular knotting mechanisms.

Knotted DNA was found first in single-stranded, circular, bacterial DNA, though double-stranded circular DNA has been found to also form knots. Naturally knotted RNA has not yet been reported.

A number of proteins containing naturally occurring molecular knots have been identified. The knot types found to be naturally occurring in proteins are the $+3_1, -3_1, 4_1, -5_2,$ and $+6_1$knots, as identified in the KnotProt database of known knotted proteins.

== Chemically synthesized molecular knots ==
Several synthetic molecular knots have been reported. Knot types that have been successfully synthesized in molecules are $3_1, 4_1, 5_1$and 8_{19} knots. Though the $-5_2$ and $+6_1$ knots have been found to naturally occur in knotted molecules, they have not been successfully synthesized. Small-molecule composite knots have also not yet been synthesized.

Artificial DNA, RNA, and protein knots have been successfully synthesized. DNA is a particularly useful model of synthetic knot synthesis, as the structure naturally forms interlocked structures and can be easily manipulated into forming knots control precisely the raveling necessary to form knots. Molecular knots are often synthesized with the help of crucial metal ion ligands.

Knot	Year	Reference
3_{1}	1989	
4_{1}	2014	
5_{1}	2012	
5_{2}	2020	
7_{1}	2020	
7_{4}	2021	
8_{18}	2018	
8_{19}	2017	

== History ==
The first researcher to suggest the existence of a molecular knot in a protein was Jane Richardson in 1977, who reported that carbonic anhydrase B (CAB) exhibited apparent knotting during her survey of various proteins' topological behavior. However, the researcher generally attributed with the discovery of the first knotted protein is Marc. L. Mansfield in 1994, as he was the first to specifically investigate the occurrence of knots in proteins and confirm the existence of the trefoil knot in CAB. Knotted DNA was found first by Liu et al. in 1981, in single-stranded, circular, bacterial DNA, though double-stranded circular DNA has been found to also form knots.

In 1989, Sauvage and coworkers reported the first synthetic knotted molecule: a trefoil synthesized via a double-helix complex with the aid of Cu+ ions.

Vogtle et al. was the first to describe molecular knots as knotanes in 2000. Also in 2000 was William Taylor's creation of an alternative computational method to analyze protein knotting that set the termini at a fixed point far enough away from the knotted component of the molecule that the knot type could be well-defined. In this study, Taylor discovered a deep $4_1$ knot in a protein. With this study, Taylor confirmed the existence of deeply knotted proteins.

In 2007, Eric Yeates reported the identification of a molecular slipknot, which is when the molecule contains knotted subchains even though their backbone chain as a whole is unknotted and does not contain completely knotted structures that are easily detectable by computational models. Mathematically, slipknots are difficult to analyze because they are not recognized in the examination of the complete structure.

A pentafoil knot prepared using dynamic covalent chemistry was synthesized by Ayme et al. in 2012, which at the time was the most complex non-DNA molecular knot prepared to date. Later in 2016, a fully organic pentafoil knot was also reported, including the very first use of a molecular knot to allosterically regulate catalysis. In January 2017, an 8_{19} knot was synthesized by David Leigh's group, making the 8_{19} knot the most complex molecular knot synthesized.

An important development in knot theory is allowing for intra-chain contacts within an entangled molecular chain. Circuit topology has emerged as a topology framework that formalises the arrangement of contacts as well as chain crossings in a folded linear chain. As a complementary approach, Colin Adams. et al., developed a singular knot theory that is applicable to folded linear chains with intramolecular interactions.

== Applications ==
Many synthetic molecular knots have a distinct globular shape and dimensions that make them potential building blocks in nanotechnology.

== See also ==
- Circuit topology of folded linear molecules
- Knot theory
- Knotted protein
- Knotted polymers
- Molecular Borromean rings
- Supramolecular chemistry
- Topology (chemistry)
- Carbon nanohoop
