= Cyanostar =

Macrocylcic molecule

A cyanostar (pentacyanopentabenzo[25]annulene) is a shape-persistent macrocycle that binds anions.

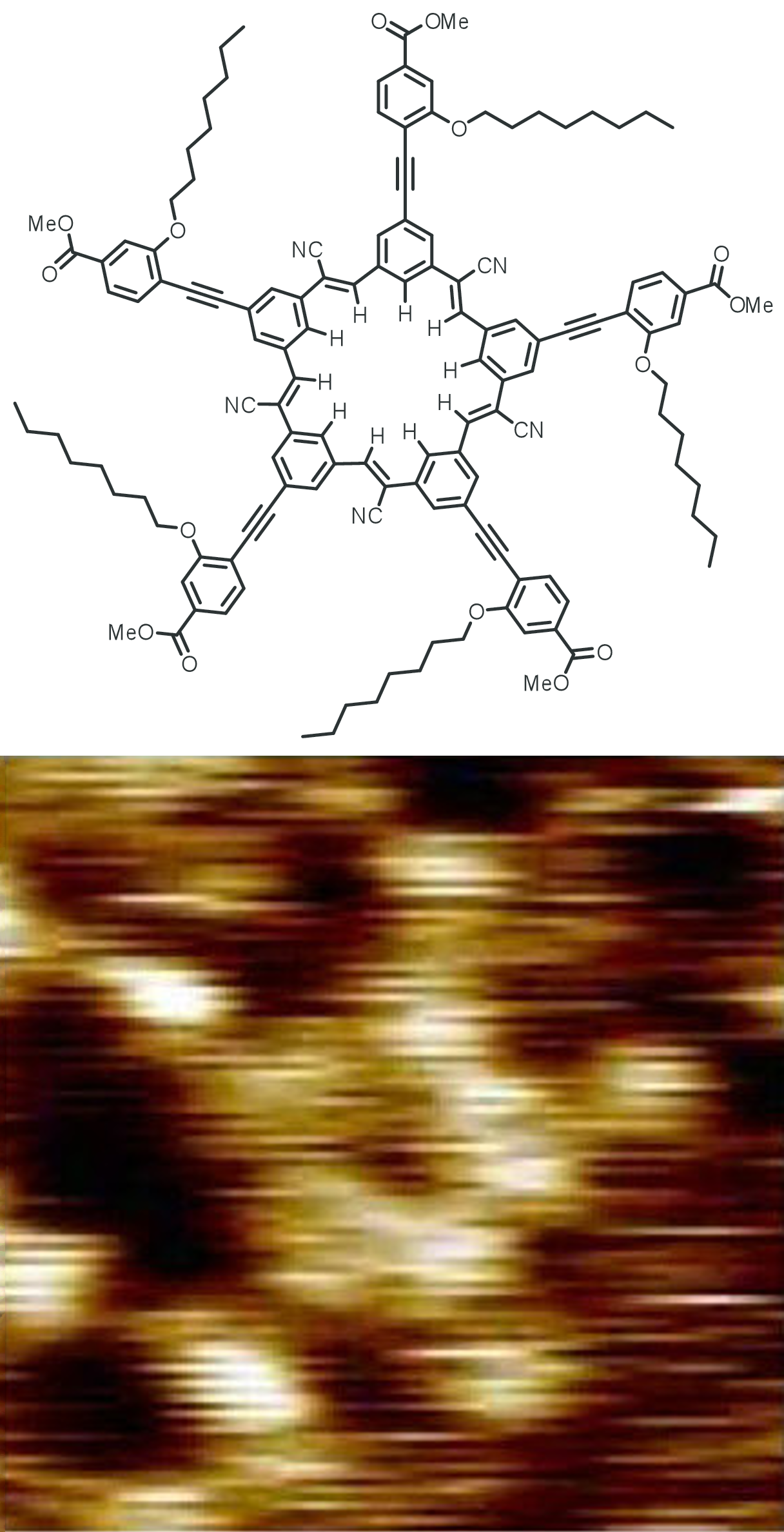
Cyanostar as the central unit of a dendrimer

== Synthesis ==
The cyanostar structure is synthesized in a one-pot process among five equivalents of a benzaldehyde bearing a meta-cyanomethyl substituent. A series of Knoevenagel condensation reactions catalyzed by various bases stitches them together to make the C5-symmetric structure.

The ring-shaped core is made by 5 cyanostilbene units. A cyanostilbene is a combination of a cyano group and a stilbene.

== Anion binding ==
Cyanostar binds anions through hydrogen bonding from the C–H bonds, as the hydrogen has a positive electrostatic potential. It is the first binder to make use of cyanostilbene's electropositive CH groups. The CH bonds create an electropositive region in the center of the macrocycle, creating a binding pocket. Cyanostar strongly binds anions that usually can only be bound weakly. The increased binding arises from the formation of a 2:1 complex, with two cyanostars sandwiching the anion on each side. An extended version of this structural pattern is a 4:3 alternating stack of cyanostar molecules complexing a hydrogen-bonded chain of dihydrogen phosphate units.

== Rotaxanes ==
Two cyanostars can be threaded onto a phosphate diester structure, forming a rotaxane. Because they have a high affinity for the central phosphate group only when it is in its anionic form, there is a substantial and reversible structural change in response to acid–base changes in solution.
