= Mechanically interlocked molecular architectures =

Molecules connected due to their topology

In chemistry, mechanically interlocked molecular architectures (MIMAs) are molecules that are connected as a consequence of their topology. This connection of molecules is analogous to keys on a keychain loop. The keys are not directly connected to the keychain loop but they cannot be separated without breaking the loop. On the molecular level, the interlocked molecules cannot be separated without the breaking of the covalent bonds that comprise the conjoined molecules; this is referred to as a mechanical bond. Examples of mechanically interlocked molecular architectures include catenanes, rotaxanes, molecular knots, and molecular Borromean rings. Work in this area was recognized with the 2016 Nobel Prize in Chemistry to Bernard L. Feringa, Jean-Pierre Sauvage, and J. Fraser Stoddart.

The synthesis of such entangled architectures has been made efficient by combining supramolecular chemistry with traditional covalent synthesis, however mechanically interlocked molecular architectures have properties that differ from both "supramolecular assemblies" and "covalently bonded molecules". The terminology "mechanical bond" has been coined to describe the connection between the components of mechanically interlocked molecular architectures. Although research into mechanically interlocked molecular architectures is primarily focused on artificial compounds, many examples have been found in biological systems including: cystine knots, cyclotides or lasso-peptides such as microcin J25 which are proteins, and a variety of peptides.

== Residual topology ==
Residual topology is a descriptive stereochemical term to classify a number of intertwined and interlocked molecules, which cannot be disentangled in an experiment without breaking of covalent bonds, while the strict rules of mathematical topology allow such a disentanglement. Examples of such molecules are rotaxanes, catenanes with covalently linked rings (so-called pretzelanes), and open knots (pseudoknots) which are abundant in proteins.

The term "residual topology" was suggested on account of a striking similarity of these compounds to the well-established topologically nontrivial species, such as catenanes and knotanes (molecular knots). The idea of residual topological isomerism introduces a handy scheme of modifying the molecular graphs and generalizes former efforts of systemization of mechanically bound and bridged molecules.

== History ==
Experimentally the first examples of mechanically interlocked molecular architectures appeared in the 1960s with catenanes being synthesized by Wasserman and Schill and rotaxanes by Harrison and Harrison. The chemistry of MIMAs came of age when Sauvage pioneered their synthesis using templating methods. In the early 1990s the usefulness and even the existence of MIMAs were challenged. The latter concern was addressed by X ray crystallographer and structural chemist David Williams. Two postdoctoral researchers who took on the challenge of producing [5]catenane (olympiadane) pushed the boundaries of the complexity of MIMAs that could be synthesized their success was confirmed in 1996 by a solid‐state structure analysis conducted by David Williams.

== Mechanical bonding and chemical reactivity ==
The introduction of a mechanical bond alters the chemistry of the sub components of rotaxanes and catenanes. Steric hindrance of reactive functionalities is increased and the strength of non-covalent interactions between the components are altered.

=== Mechanical bonding effects on non-covalent interactions ===
The strength of non-covalent interactions in a mechanically interlocked molecular architecture increases as compared to the non-mechanically bonded analogues. This increased strength is demonstrated by the necessity of harsher conditions to remove a metal template ion from catenanes as opposed to their non-mechanically bonded analogues. This effect is referred to as the "catenand effect". The augmented non-covalent interactions in interlocked systems compared to non-interlocked systems has found utility in the strong and selective binding of a range of charged species, enabling the development of interlocked systems for the extraction of a range of salts. This increase in strength of non-covalent interactions is attributed to the loss of degrees of freedom upon the formation of a mechanical bond. The increase in strength of non-covalent interactions is more pronounced on smaller interlocked systems, where more degrees of freedom are lost, as compared to larger mechanically interlocked systems where the change in degrees of freedom is lower. Therefore, if the ring in a rotaxane is made smaller the strength of non-covalent interactions increases, the same effect is observed if the thread is made smaller as well.

=== Mechanical bonding effects on chemical reactivity ===
The mechanical bond can reduce the kinetic reactivity of the products, this is ascribed to the increased steric hindrance. Because of this effect hydrogenation of an alkene on the thread of a rotaxane is significantly slower as compared to the equivalent non interlocked thread. This effect has allowed for the isolation of otherwise reactive intermediates.

The ability to alter reactivity without altering covalent structure has led to MIMAs being investigated for a number of technological applications.

=== Applications of mechanical bonding in controlling chemical reactivity ===
The ability for a mechanical bond to reduce reactivity and hence prevent unwanted reactions has been exploited in a number of areas. One of the earliest applications was in the protection of organic dyes from environmental degradation.

== Examples ==
- Olympiadane
- Olympic gel
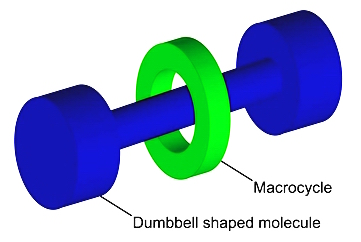
Rotaxane

Catenane

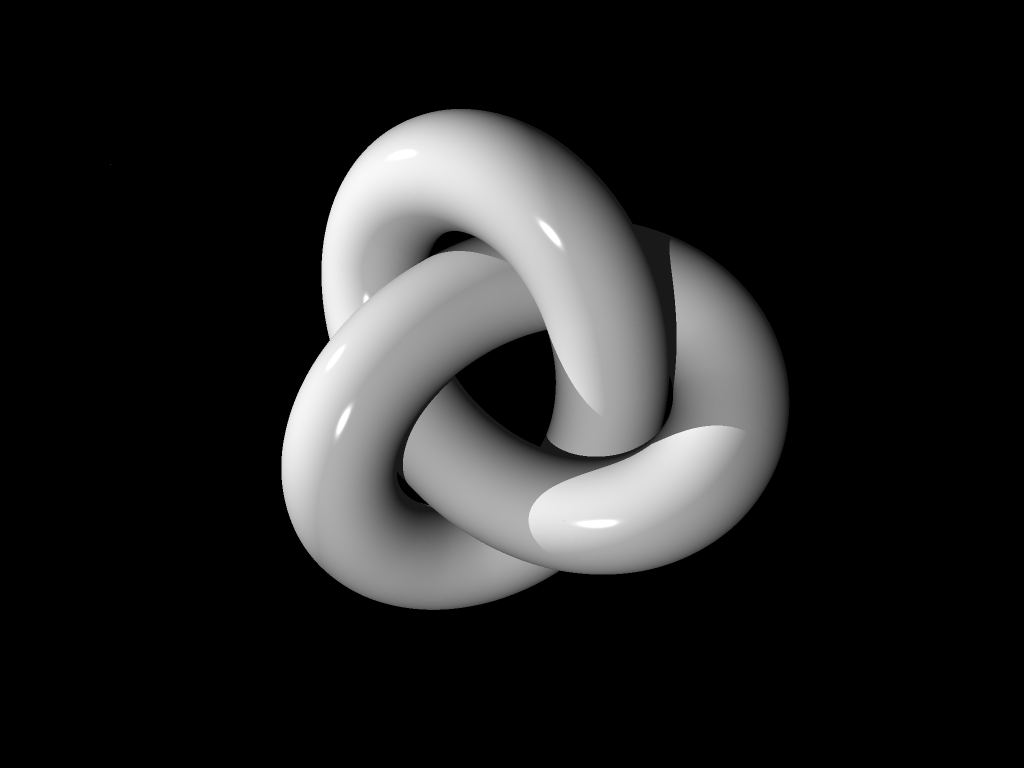
Molecular knot

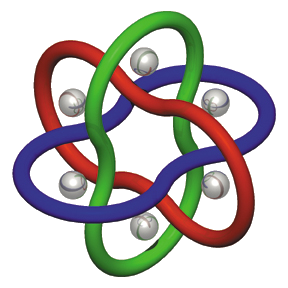
Molecular Borromean rings
