= Circuit topology =

Graph topology applied to electrical and communications circuits, or biomolecules

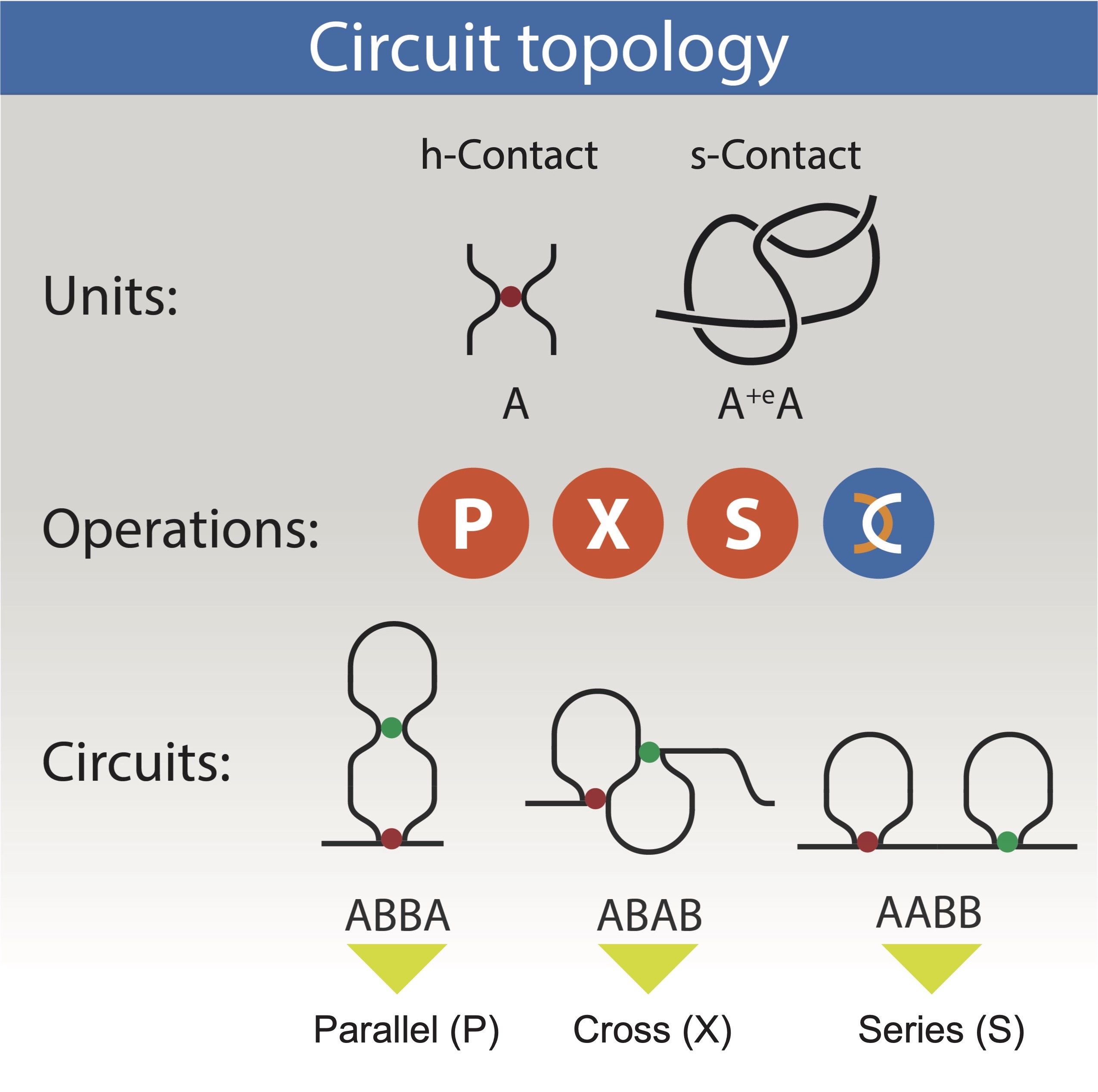
Circuit topology relations in a chain with two binary contacts.

The circuit topology of a folded linear polymer is the arrangement of its intra-molecular contacts. Examples of linear polymers with intra-molecular contacts are nucleic acids and proteins. Proteins fold via the formation of contacts of various natures, including hydrogen bonds, disulfide bonds, and beta-beta interactions. RNA molecules fold by forming hydrogen bonds between nucleotides, forming nested or non-nested structures. Contacts in the genome are established via protein bridges including CTCF and cohesins and are measured by technologies including Hi-C. Circuit topology categorizes the topological arrangement of these physical contacts, that are referred to as hard contacts (or h-contacts). Furthermore, chains can fold via knotting (or the formation of "soft" contacts (s-contacts)). Circuit topology uses a similar language to categorize both "soft" and "hard" contacts, and provides a full description of a folded linear chain. In this framework, a "circuit" refers to a segment of the chain where each contact site within the segment forms connections with other contact sites within the same segment, and thus is not left unpaired. A folded chain can thus be studied based on its constituent circuits.

A simple example of a folded chain is a chain with two hard contacts. For a chain with two binary contacts, three arrangements are available: parallel (P), series (S), and crossed (X). For a chain with n contacts, the topology can be described by an n by n matrix in which each element illustrates the relation between a pair of contacts and may take one of the three states, P, S and X. Multivalent contacts can also be categorised in full or via decomposition into several binary contacts. Similarly, circuit topology allows for the classification of the pairwise arrangements of chain crossings and tangles, thus providing a complete 3D description of folded chains. Furthermore, one can apply circuit topology operations to soft and hard contacts to generate complex folds, using a bottom-up engineering approach.

Both knot theory and circuit topology aim to describe chain entanglement, making it important to understand their relationship. Knot theory considers any entangled chain as a connected sum of prime knots, which are themselves undecomposable. Circuit topology splits any entangled chains (including prime knots) into basic structural units called soft contacts, and lists simple rules on how soft contacts can be put together. An advantage of circuit topology is that it can be applied to open linear chains with intra-chain interactions, so-called hard contacts. This enabled topological analysis of proteins and genomes, which are often described as unknot in knot theory. Finally, circuit topology enables studying interactions between hard contacts and entanglements and can identify slip knots, while knot theory typically overlooks hard contacts and split knots. Thus, circuit topology serves as a complementary approach to knot theory.

Circuit topology has implications for folding kinetics and molecular evolution and has been applied to engineer polymers including molecular origami. Circuit topology along with contact order and size are determinants of the folding rate of linear polymers. It has also been applied to quantify the conformational organisation of intrinsically disordered proteins. In protein structure prediction, coarse-grained generative approaches recover global topological features of protein folds and enable rapid contact map prediction. Circuit topology can be applied to characterise the topology of multi-chain systems as well, including biomolecular condensates and aggregates. For example, it has been used to characterise coil–globule transitions and aggregation in polymers, revealing multichain topological motifs during collective structural transitions. In addition, circuit topology has been applied to classify conformational substates in amyloid polypeptides, providing insight into aggregation mechanisms and their modulation by small molecules. Finally, the topology approach can also be used for medical applications including disease analysis, and drug response predictions.

== See also ==
- Topology (chemistry)
