= Topology (chemistry) =

In chemistry, topology (also known as chemical topology or molecular topology) provides a way of describing and predicting the molecular structure within the constraints of three-dimensional (3-D) space. Given the determinants of chemical bonding and the chemical properties of the atoms, applied topology provides a model for explaining how the atoms ethereal wave functions must fit together. Molecular topology is a part of mathematical chemistry dealing with the algebraic description of chemical compounds so allowing a unique and easy characterization of them. A specialization of this field is molecular nanotopology.

Topology is insensitive to the details of a scalar field, and can often be determined using simplified calculations. Scalar fields such as electron density, Madelung field, covalent field and the electrostatic potential can be used to model topology.

Each scalar field has its own distinctive topology and each provides different information about the nature of chemical bonding and structure. The analysis of these topologies, when combined with simple electrostatic theory and a few empirical observations, leads to a quantitative model of localized chemical bonding. In the process, the analysis provides insights into the nature of chemical bonding.

Applied topology explains how large molecules reach their final shapes and how biological molecules achieve their activity.

Circuit topology is a topological property of folded linear polymers. It describes the arrangement of intra-chain contacts. Contacts can be established by intra-chain interactions, the so called hard contacts (h-contacts), or via chain entanglement or soft contacts (s-contacts). This notion has been applied to structural analysis of biomolecules such as proteins, RNAs, and genomes.

== Topological indices ==
It is possible to set up equations correlating direct quantitative structure activity relationships with experimental properties, usually referred to as topological indices (TIs). Topological indices are used in the development of quantitative structure-activity relationships (QSARs) in which the biological activity or other properties of molecules are correlated with their chemical structure.

== See also ==
- Circuit topology
- Topological index
- Theoretical chemistry
- Molecular geometry
- Molecular graph
- Molecular knot
- Molecular Borromean rings
