= Catenane =

Molecule composed of two or more intertwined rings

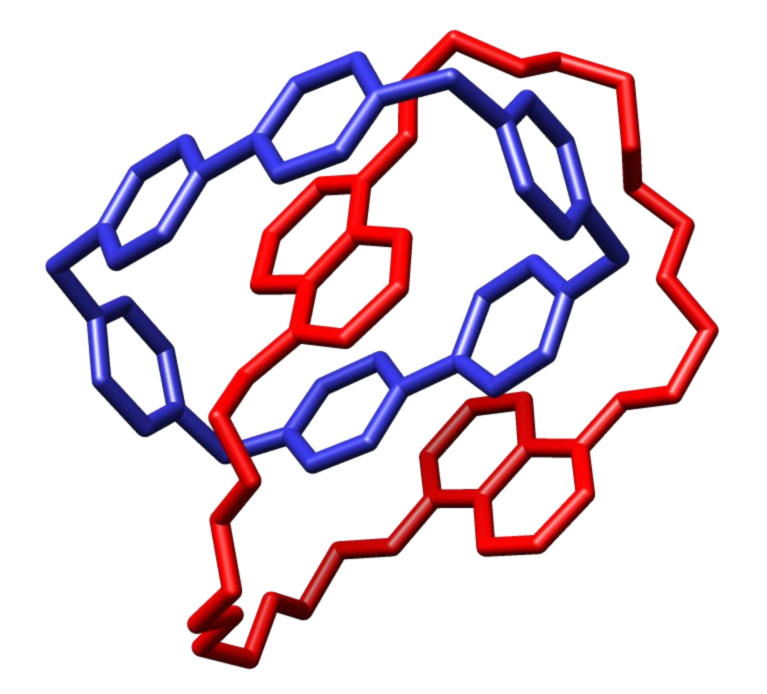
Crystal structure of a catenane with a cyclobis(paraquat-p-phenylene) macrocycle reported by Stoddart and coworkers.

Schematic animation of the template-directed synthesis of the bis-bipyridinium cyclophane / para-phenylene crown ether [2]catenane described in the text.

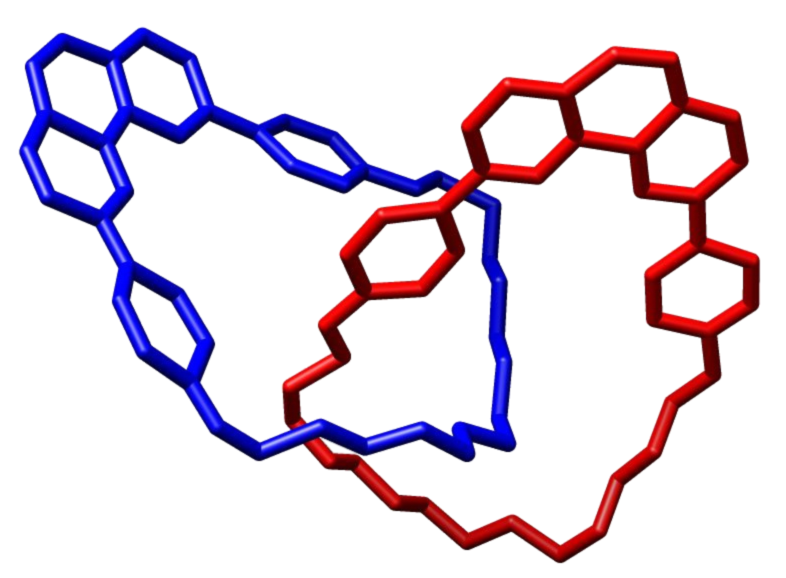
Crystal structure of a catenane reported by Sauvage and coworkers.

In macromolecular chemistry, a catenane (from Latin catena 'chain') is a mechanically interlocked molecular architecture consisting of two or more interlocked macrocycles, i.e. a molecule containing two or more intertwined rings. The interlocked rings cannot be separated without breaking the covalent bonds of the macrocycles. They are conceptually related to other mechanically interlocked molecular architectures, such as rotaxanes, molecular knots or molecular Borromean rings. The term “mechanical bond” is used to describe the interlocked nature of the macrocycles. The idea of mechanically linked macrocycles has been talked about since the early 1900s. The earliest mention is attributed to a seminar by Nobel Laureate Richard Willstätter, though any documentation of this discussion has been lost. The first successful synthesis of a catenane was completed in 1960 by Edel Wasserman. Catenanes have been synthesized in two different ways: statistical synthesis and template-directed synthesis.

== Properties ==
The properties of catenanes are tied to the interlocked nature of the molecules. Additionally, catenanes have been synthesized with many functional units, including redox-active groups (e.g. viologen, TTF=tetrathiafulvalene), photoisomerizable groups (e.g. azobenzene), fluorescent groups, and chiral groups. Some such units have been used to create molecular switches, as well as for the fabrication of molecular electronic devices and molecular sensors.

=== Mechanical bond ===
The strength of the mechanical bond, much like the strength of any covalent bond in a non-entangled molecule, is important for determining the properties and reactivity of catenanes. The strength is considered to be similar to that of the weakest bond in one of the macrocycles, since breaking that bond would break the mechanical bond. Mechanical bond strength is not necessarily correlated with the level of entanglement of the catenane, or the number of times the rings cross.

=== Isomerism ===
Isomerism in catenanes can depend on how the interlocked components are arranged. If exchange between isomers is possible depends on the type of isomerism and on the characteristics of both the overall catenane and the individual macrocycles. One common type is co-conformational isomerism, in which isomers differ in the relative orientation of the macrocycles. The interconversion between co-conformational isomers has been used as a mechanism for molecular switches. Topological isomers have the same covalent bonding structure but different topologies, such as number of crossings. These types isomers are not interconvertible, as it would require the breaking and reformation of a covalent bond. As an example, catenanes themselves are topological isomers of the unlinked macrocycles because there is no differences in the number or identity of any atoms or bonds. In addition, many catenanes are chiral, either because of the inclusion of chiral motifs or because of the mechanical bond.

== Synthesis ==
Statistical synthesis of the first [2]catenane by Wasserman and coworkers in 1960. The threading of the linear molecule shown in red through the deuterated macrocycle resulted in a small amount of the [2]catenane. For the groups labelled CD_{2}, hydrogen atoms have been replaced by deuterium atoms.

There are two primary approaches to the organic synthesis of catenanes. The first method, used by Wasserman, is statistical synthesis. This involved threading a linear molecule through a macrocycle. The method is inefficient largely due to the low probability of a covalent bond forming that locks the rings together, as entropy is greatly decreased during the reaction. The second, much more commonly used method is template directed synthesis, in which precursors with energetically favorable interactions are preorganized in an orientation that favors entanglement of the macrocycles. An example of a templated synthesis used bis-bipyridinium salts which form strong complexes threaded through crown ether bis(para-phenylene)-34-crown-10.

Several types of templates have been developed. The earliest developed were covalent bonding templates, which involve temporary covalent bonding between the macrocycles as a method of preorganization. The breaking of these covalent bonds would result in the final formation of the interlocked catenane. Other template directed syntheses rely on noncovalent interactions such as metal ion coordination, donor-acceptor interactions, hydrogen bonding, and hydrophobic effects. Metal ions can act as both templates and as a catalyst for the formation of the covalent bond that interlocks the macrocycles. The first use of a metal template, by Sauvage and coworkers, demonstrated that catenanes were readily accessible and was a major contribution to the growth of the field.

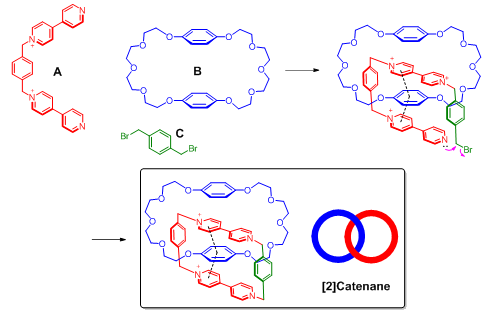
Example of template directed synthesis towards a [2]catenane. This is the Stoddart synthesis, or donor-acceptor interaction-templated synthesis

Template directed syntheses are mostly performed under kinetic control, when the macrocyclization (catenation) reaction is irreversible. The thermodynamically controlled synthesis is a reversible process. The unlinked and linked macrocycles are in equilibrium, so this process provides an error correction mechanism; even if a macrocycle closes without forming a catenane it can re-open and yield the desired interlocked structure later. The approach also provides information on the affinity constants between different macrocycles thanks to the equilibrium between the individual components and the catenanes, allowing a titration-like experiment. The groups of Sanders and Otto have shown that dynamic combinatorial approaches using reversible chemistry can be particularly successful in preparing new catenanes of unpredictable structure.

== Families ==
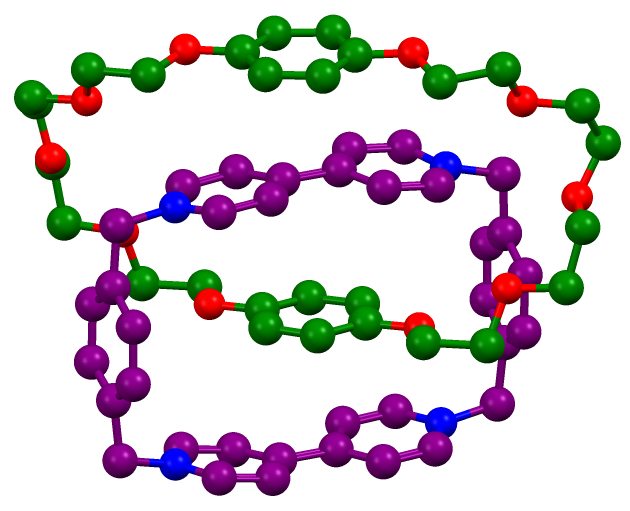
Catenane derived from cyclobis(paraquat-p-phenylene)(a cyclophane with two viologen units) and a cyclic polyether (bis(para-phenylene-34-crown-10)). Carbon atoms of the two rotaxane components are colored green and purple. Otherwise, O = red, N = blue. H atoms are omitted. The second of Nobel Prizes in Chemistry involving crown ethers was awarded for the design and synthesis of molecular machines. Many of these "machines" incorporate crown ethers as essential design components.

There are a number of distinct methods of holding the precursors together prior to the ultimate ring-closing reaction in a template-directed catenane synthesis. Each noncovalent approach to catenane formation results in what can be considered different families of catenanes.

Another family of catenanes are called pretzelanes or bridged [2]catenanes after their likeness to pretzels with a spacer linking the two macrocycles. In one such system one macrocycle is an electron deficient oligo Bis-bipyridinium ring and the other cycle is crown ether cyclophane based on para phenylene or naphthalene. X-ray diffraction shows that due to pi-pi interactions the aromatic group of the cyclophane is held firmly inside the pyridinium ring. A limited number of (rapidly interchanging) conformers exist for this type of compound.

In handcuff-shaped catenanes, two connected rings are threaded through the same ring. The bis-macrocycle (red) contains two phenanthroline units in a crown ether chain. The interlocking ring is self-assembled when two more phenanthroline units with alkene arms coordinate through a copper(I) complex followed by a metathesis ring closing step.

Families of catenanes

Catenanes

Pretzelanes

Handcuff-shaped catenanes

== Nomenclature ==
In catenane nomenclature, a number in square brackets precedes the word "catenane" in order to indicate how many rings are involved. Discrete catenanes up to a [7]catenane have been synthesised.

== Research applications ==
=== Molecular machines ===
The interlocked rings rotate with respect to one another. This motion can often be evaluated by NMR spectroscopy, among other methods. When molecular recognition motifs exist in the finished catenane (usually those that were used to synthesize the catenane), the catenane can have one or more thermodynamically preferred positions of the rings with respect to each other (recognition sites). In the case where one recognition site is a switchable moiety, a mechanical molecular switch results when interconversion between the co-conformers is initiated by a specific stimulus. A mechanical molecular switch is a type of molecular machine. A single molecule or molecular system can act as a molecular machine when some external stimuli can be used to cause mechanical movement within the molecule, like converting between co-conformors, and a task is performed. In molecular switches, the state of the overall system depends on the state of the switch. When a catenane is synthesized by coordination of the macrocycles around a metal ion, then removal and re-insertion of the metal ion can switch the free motion of the rings on and off.

Translational isomerism of a [2]catenane, induced by solvent interaction as described in the text. The two macrocycles change positions relative to one another to maximize (left) or minimize (right) hydrogen bonding.

One example of how a catenane can act as a molecular switch is solvent based with switching, where the macrocycles interact via hydrogen bonding in a halogenated solvent, then switch co-conformations when placed in a hydrogen bond disrupting solvent such as DMSO-d_{6}. This switching is reversible so, like with all molecular switches, the work that is done by initiating the switch can be undone by reverting to original conditions. The first use of catenanes as molecular machines was demonstrated by Stoddart and coworkers. In 2016 Stoddart, Sauvage, and Feringa were awarded the Nobel Prize in chemistry for their work with molecular machines.

If there are more than one recognition sites, it is possible to observe distinct colors depending on the recognition site the ring occupies and thus it is possible to change the color of the catenane solution by changing the preferred recognition site. When the catenane is transition metal complexed, switching between the two sites may be achieved by the use of chemical, electrochemical or even visible light based methods.

=== Anion sensing ===
Catenanes can act as host molecules, with their cavities showing high levels of molecular recognition. With the incorporation of a reporting group, catenanes can act as electrochemical or optical sensors for bound, charged guest molecules. Though catenanes can sense both cations and anions, the sensing of negatively charged anions has been much more developed. Incorporating a cavity for the binding of anions requires an anion-templated synthesis. Several examples of strategies for sensing host molecules have been reported, including the incorporation of luminophores, the inclusion of ferrocene for electrochemical anion sensing, and the incorporation of halogens in the macrocycles that can recognize halogen guest molecules through halogen bonding.

=== Catalysis ===
Catenanes also have potential applications in catalysis. If the 3D structure of the mechanical bond allows for preorganization of functional groups that favors a desired process, the steric constraints of the catenane enhances reactivity. Conversely, the steric crowding of catenanes can also inhibit reactivity, so catenanes can be used for stimuli-regulated catalysis when combined with the chemistry behind their use as molecular switches. Chiral catenanes have an additional potential application in asymmetrical catalysis.

== See also ==
- Olympiadane
- Polycatenane
