= Rotaxane =

Interlocked molecular structure resembling a dumbbell

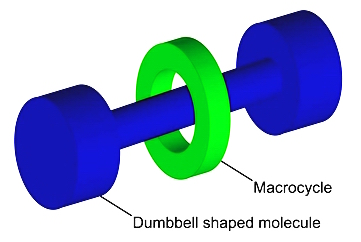
Graphical representation of a rotaxane

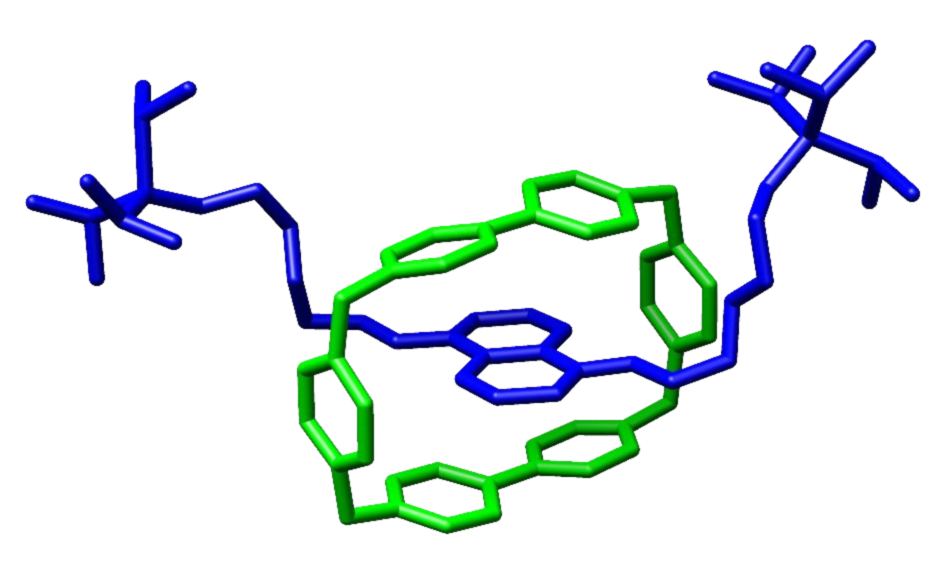
Structure of a rotaxane that has a cyclobis(paraquat-p-phenylene) macrocycle.

A rotaxane (from Latin rota 'wheel' and axis 'axle') is a mechanically interlocked molecular architecture consisting of a dumbbell-shaped molecule which is threaded through a macrocycle (see graphical representation). The two components of a rotaxane are kinetically trapped since the ends of the dumbbell (often called stoppers) are larger than the internal diameter of the ring and prevent dissociation (unthreading) of the components since this would require significant distortion of the covalent bonds.

Much of the research concerning rotaxanes and other mechanically interlocked molecular architectures, such as catenanes, has been focused on their efficient synthesis or their utilization as artificial molecular machines. However, examples of rotaxane substructure have been found in naturally occurring peptides, including: cystine knot peptides, cyclotides or lasso-peptides such as microcin J25.

== Synthesis ==
The earliest reported synthesis of a rotaxane in 1967 relied on the statistical probability that if two halves of a dumbbell-shaped molecule were reacted in the presence of a macrocycle that some small percentage would connect through the ring. To obtain a reasonable quantity of rotaxane, the macrocycle was attached to a solid-phase support and treated with both halves of the dumbbell 70 times and then severed from the support to give a 6% yield. However, the synthesis of rotaxanes has advanced significantly and efficient yields can be obtained by preorganizing the components utilizing hydrogen bonding, metal coordination, hydrophobic forces, covalent bonds, or coulombic interactions. The three most common strategies to synthesize rotaxane are "capping", "clipping", and "slipping", though others do exist. Recently, Leigh and co-workers described a new pathway to mechanically interlocked architectures involving a transition-metal center that can catalyse a reaction through the cavity of a macrocycle.

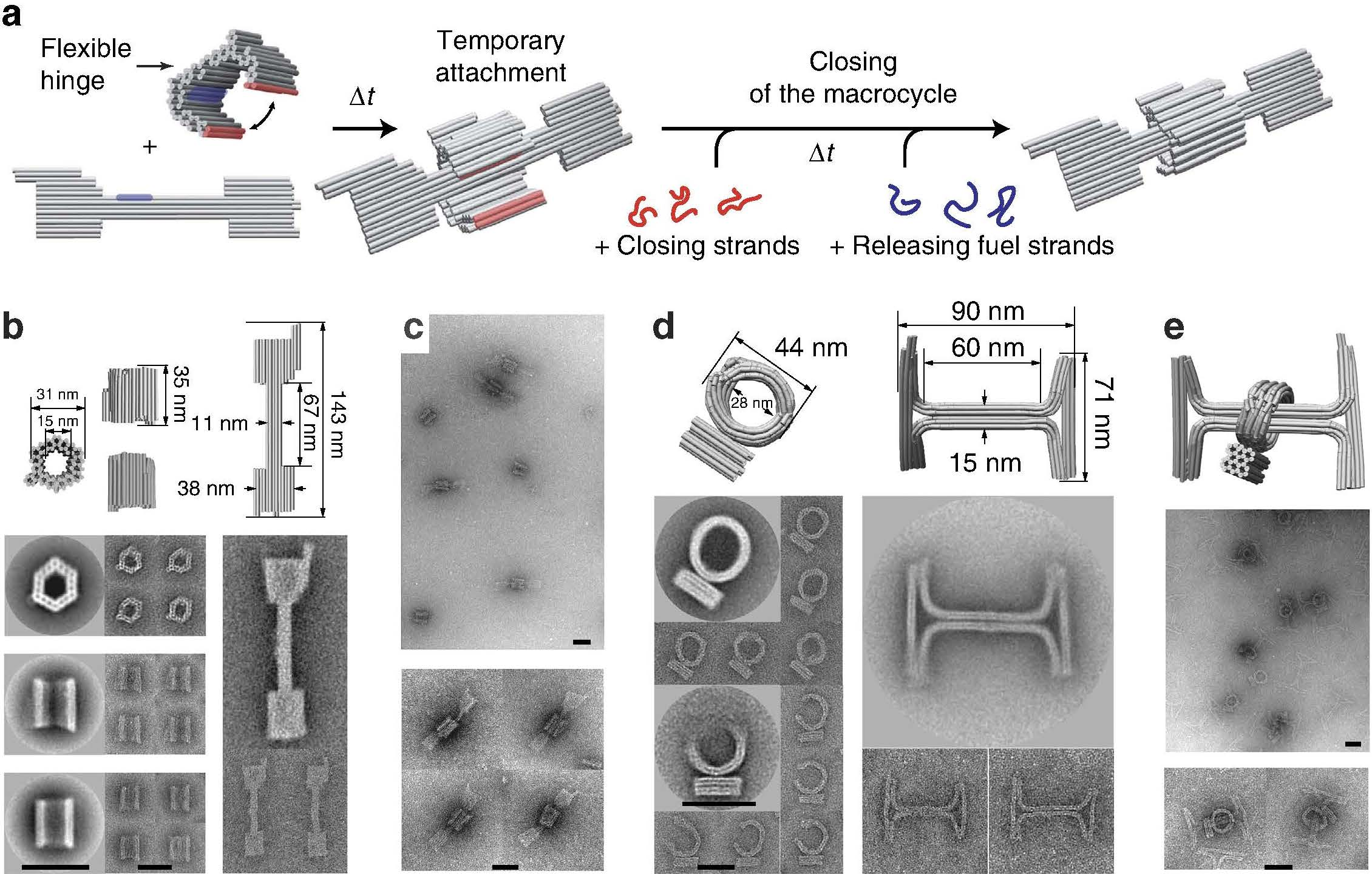
(a) A rotaxane is formed from an open ring (R1) with a flexible hinge and a dumbbell-shaped DNA origami structure (D1). The hinge of the ring consists of a series of strand crossovers into which additional thymines are inserted to provide higher flexibility. Ring and axis subunits are first connected and positioned with respect to each other using 18 nucleotide long, complementary sticky ends 33 nm away from the center of the axis (blue regions). The ring is then closed around the dumbbell axis using closing strands (red), followed by the addition of release strands that separate dumbbell from ring via toehold-mediated strand displacement. (b) 3D models and corresponding averaged TEM images of the ring and dumbbell structure. (c) TEM images of the completely assembled rotaxanes (R1D1). (d) 3D models, averaged and single-particle TEM images of R2 and D2, subunits of an alternative rotaxane design containing bent structural elements. The TEM images of the ring structure correspond to the closed (top) and open (bottom) configurations. (e) 3D representation and TEM images of the fully assembled R2D2 rotaxane. Scale bar, 50 nm.

=== Capping ===
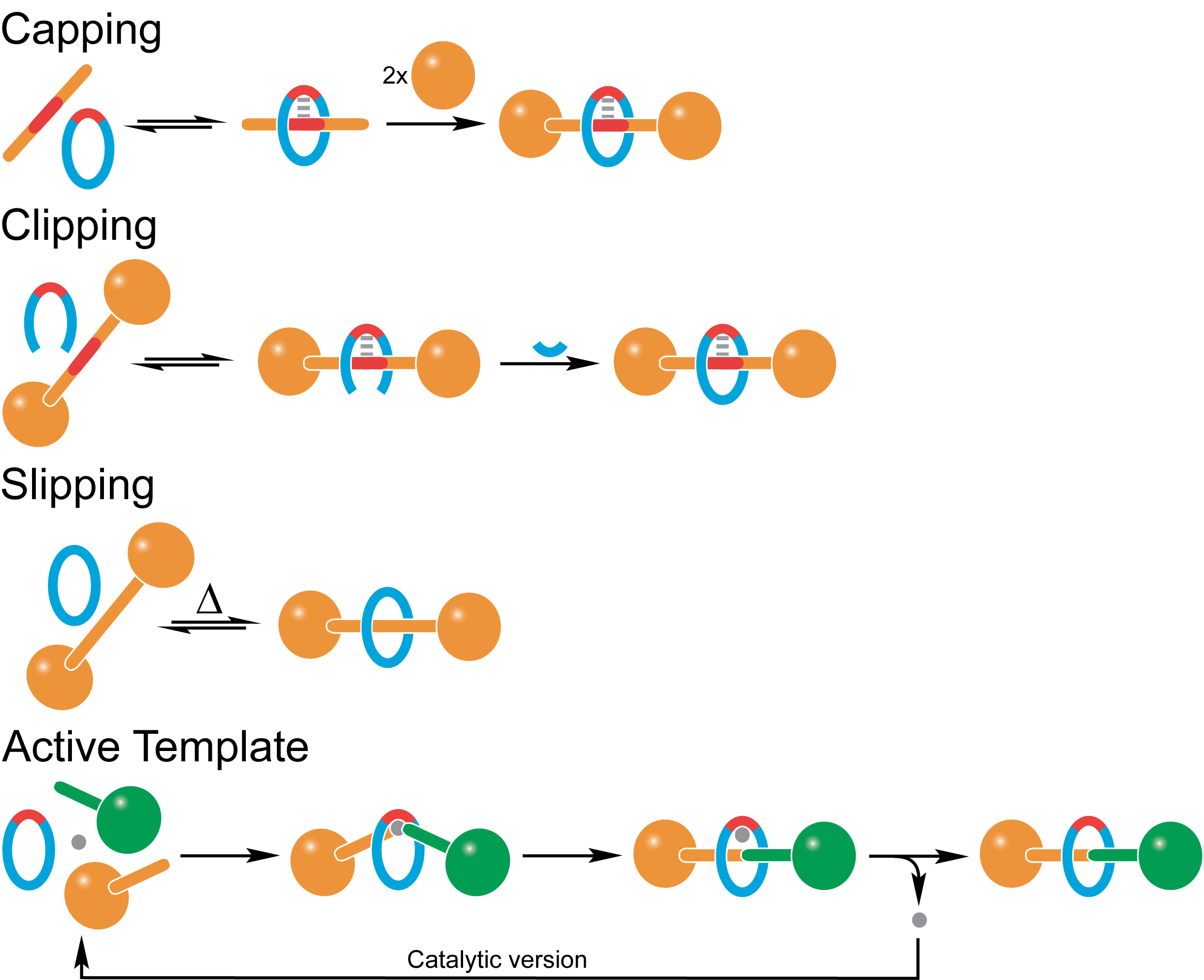
Rotaxane synthesis can be carried out via a "capping," "clipping, "slipping" or "active template" mechanism

Synthesis via the capping method relies strongly upon a thermodynamically driven template effect; that is, the "thread" is held within the "macrocycle" by non-covalent interactions, for example rotaxinations with cyclodextrin macrocycles involve exploitation of the hydrophobic effect. This dynamic complex or pseudorotaxane is then converted to the rotaxane by reacting the ends of the threaded guest with large groups, preventing disassociation.

=== Clipping ===
The clipping method is similar to the capping reaction except that in this case the dumbbell shaped molecule is complete and is bound to a partial macrocycle. The partial macrocycle then undergoes a ring closing reaction around the dumbbell-shaped molecule, forming the rotaxane.

=== Slipping ===
The method of slipping is one which exploits the thermodynamic stability of the rotaxane. If the end groups of the dumbbell are an appropriate size it will be able to reversibly thread through the macrocycle at higher temperatures. By cooling the dynamic complex, it becomes kinetically trapped as a rotaxane at the lower temperature.

=== Snapping ===
Snapping involves two separate parts of the thread, both containing a bulky group. one part of the thread is then threaded to the macrocycle, forming a semi rotaxane, and end is closed of by the other part of the thread forming the rotaxane.

=== "Active template" methodology ===
Leigh and co-workers recently began to explore a strategy in which template ions could also play an active role in promoting the crucial final covalent bond forming reaction that captures the interlocked structure (i.e., the metal has a dual function, acting as a template for entwining the precursors and catalyzing covalent bond formation between the reactants).

== Potential applications ==
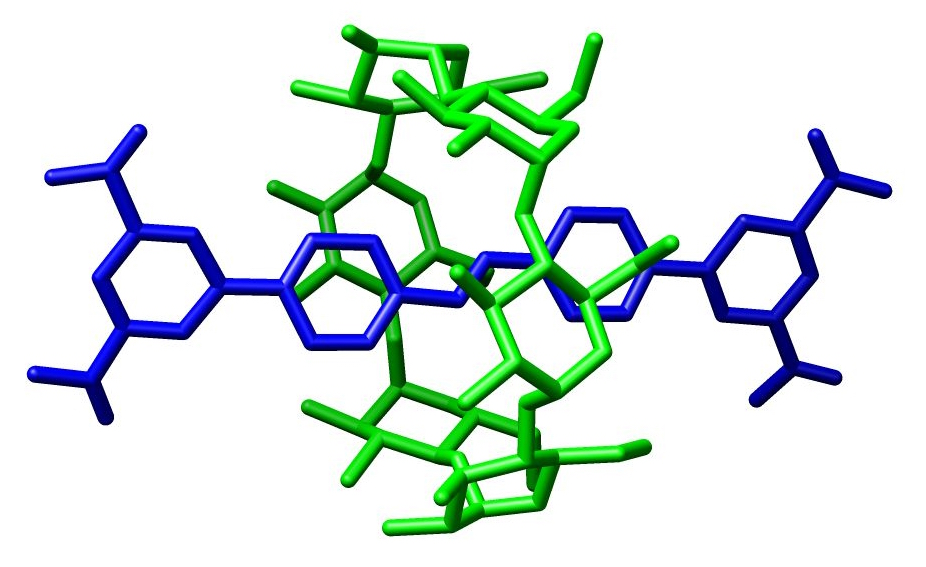
Structure of a rotaxane with an α-cyclodextrin macrocycle.

=== Molecular machines ===
Animation of a pH-controlled molecular rotaxane shuttle

Rotaxane-based molecular machines have been of initial interest for their potential use in molecular electronics as logic molecular switching elements and as molecular shuttles. These molecular machines are usually based on the movement of the macrocycle on the dumbbell. The macrocycle can rotate around the axis of the dumbbell like a wheel and axle or it can slide along its axis from one site to another. Controlling the position of the macrocycle allows the rotaxane to function as a molecular switch, with each possible location of the macrocycle corresponding to a different state. These rotaxane machines can be manipulated both by chemical and photochemical inputs. Rotaxane based systems have also been shown to function as molecular muscles. In 2009, there was a report of a "domino effect" from one extremity to the other in a Glycorotaxane Molecular Machine. In this case, the ^{4}C_{1} or ^{1}C_{4} chair-like conformation of the mannopyranoside stopper can be controlled, depending on the localization of the macrocycle. In 2012, unique pseudo-macrocycles consisting of double-lasso molecular machines (also called rotamacrocycles) were reported in Chem. Sci. These structures can be tightened or loosened depending on pH. A controllable jump rope movement was also observed in these new molecular machines.

=== Ultrastable dyes ===
Potential application as long-lasting dyes is based on the enhanced stability of the inner portion of the dumbbell-shaped molecule. Studies with cyclodextrin-protected rotaxane azo dyes established this characteristic. More reactive squaraine dyes have also been shown to have enhanced stability by preventing nucleophilic attack of the inner squaraine moiety. The enhanced stability of rotaxane dyes is attributed to the insulating effect of the macrocycle, which is able to block interactions with other molecules.

=== Nanorecording ===
In a nanorecording application, a certain rotaxane is deposited as a Langmuir–Blodgett film on ITO-coated glass. When a positive voltage is applied with the tip of a scanning tunneling microscope probe, the rotaxane rings in the tip area switch to a different part of the dumbbell and the resulting new conformation makes the molecules stick out 0.3 nanometer from the surface. This height difference is sufficient for a memory dot. It is not yet known how to erase such a nanorecording film.

== Nomenclature ==
Accepted nomenclature is to designate the number of components of the rotaxane in brackets as a prefix. Therefore, the rotaxane consisting of a single dumbbell-shaped axial molecule with a single macrocycle around its shaft is called a [2]rotaxane, and two cyanostar molecules around the central phosphate group of dialkylphosphate is a [3]rotaxane.

== See also ==
- Catenane
- Mechanically interlocked molecular architecture
- Molecular Borromean ring
- Molecular knot
- Polyrotaxane
