= Molecular Borromean ring =

Molecule composed of three interlocked rings

In chemistry, molecular Borromean rings are an example of a mechanically-interlocked molecular architecture in which three macrocycles are interlocked in such a way that breaking any macrocycle allows the others to dissociate. They are the smallest examples of Borromean rings. The synthesis of molecular Borromean rings was reported in 2004 by the group of J. Fraser Stoddart. The so-called Borromeate is made up of three interpenetrated macrocycles formed through templated self assembly as complexes of zinc.

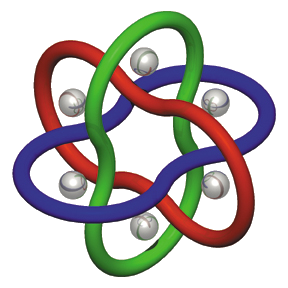
Schematic of a molecular Borromean ring.

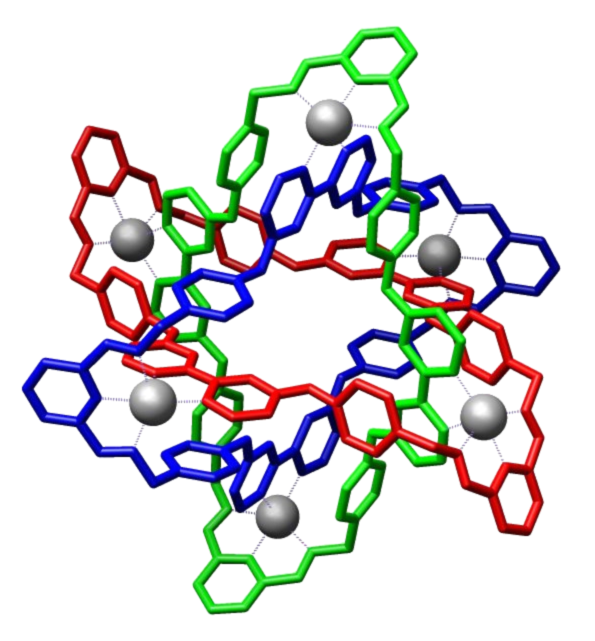
Crystal structure reported by Stoddart

The synthesis of the macrocyclic systems involves self-assembles of two organic building blocks: 2,6-diformylpyridine (an aromatic compound with two aldehyde groups positioned ortho to the nitrogen atom of the pyridine ring) and a symmetric diamine containing a meta-substituted 2,2'-bipyridine group. Zinc acetate is added as the template for the reaction, resulting in one zinc cation in each of the six pentacoordinate complexation sites. Trifluoroacetic acid (TFA) is added to catalyse the imine bond-forming reactions. The preparation of the tri-ring Borromeate involves a total of 18 precursor molecules and is only possible because the building blocks self-assemble through 12 aromatic pi-pi interactions and 30 zinc to nitrogen dative bonds. Because of these interactions, the Borromeate is thermodynamically the most stable reaction product out of potentially many others. As a consequence of all the reactions taking place being equilibria, the Borromeate is the predominant reaction product.

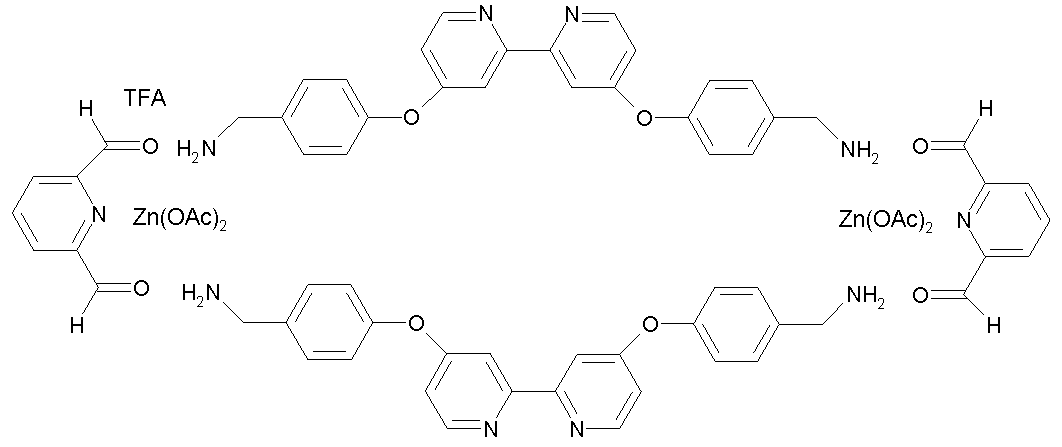
Synthesis of one ring in Borromean ring system from 2,6-diformylpyridine and a diamine in presence of zinc acetate and TFA. The ring-system consists of three such interlocked rings

Reduction with sodium borohydride in ethanol affords the neutral Borromeand. With the zinc removed, the three macrocycles are no longer chemically bonded but remain "mechanically entangled in such a way that that if only one of the rings is removed the other two can part company." The Borromeand is thus a true Borromean system as cleavage of just one imine bond (to an amine and an acetal) in this structure breaks the mechanical bond between the three constituent macrocycles, releasing the other two individual rings. A borromeand differs from a [3]catenane in that none of its three macrocycles is concatenated with another other; if one bond in a [3]catenane is broken and a cycle removed, a [2]catenane can remain.

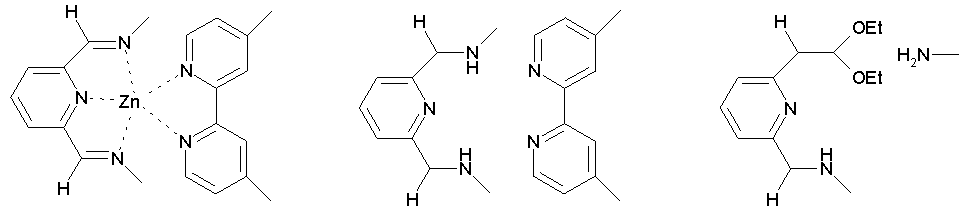
From left to right: Zinc complex with pyridine group and orthogonal bipyridine groups in Borromeate. Reduction to Borromeand with removal of zinc coordination. Bond cleavage of imine to acetal by action of ethanol

Organic synthesis of this seemingly complex compound is in reality fairly simple; for this reason, the Stoddart group has suggested it as a gram-scale laboratory activity for undergraduate organic chemistry courses.

== See also ==
- Dynamic covalent chemistry
- Molecular knot
- Topology (chemistry)
