= Engine =

Machine that converts one or more forms of energy into mechanical energy (of motion)

An animation showing the four stages of a four-stroke gasoline-fueled internal combustion cycle with electrical ignition source: 1. Induction (Fuel enters); 2. Compression; 3. Ignition (Fuel is burnt); 4. Emission (Exhaust exits)

Diagram of a jet engine. Jet engines use the heat of combustion to generate a high-velocity exhaust as a form of reaction engine. Mechanical energy to power the aircraft's electrical and hydraulic systems can be taken from the turbine shaft, but thrust is produced by expelled exhaust gas.

An engine or motor is a machine designed to convert one or more forms of energy into mechanical energy.

Available energy sources include potential energy (e.g. energy of the Earth's gravitational field as exploited in hydroelectric power generation), heat energy (e.g. geothermal), chemical energy, electric potential and nuclear energy (from nuclear fission or nuclear fusion). Many of these processes generate heat as an intermediate energy form; thus heat engines have special importance. Some natural processes, such as atmospheric convection cells convert environmental heat into motion (e.g. in the form of rising air currents). Mechanical energy is of particular importance in transportation, but also plays a role in many industrial processes such as cutting, grinding, crushing, and mixing.

Mechanical heat engines convert heat into work via various thermodynamic processes. The internal combustion engine is perhaps the most common example of a mechanical heat engine in which heat from the combustion of a fuel causes rapid pressurisation of the gaseous combustion products in the combustion chamber, causing them to expand and drive a piston, which turns a crankshaft. Unlike internal combustion engines, a reaction engine (such as a jet engine) produces thrust by expelling reaction mass, in accordance with Newton's third law of motion.

Apart from heat engines, electric motors convert electrical energy into mechanical motion, pneumatic motors use compressed air, and clockwork motors in wind-up toys use elastic energy. In biological systems, molecular motors, like myosins in muscles, use chemical energy to create forces and ultimately motion (a chemical engine, but not a heat engine).

Chemical heat engines which employ air (ambient atmospheric gas) as a part of the fuel reaction are regarded as airbreathing engines. Chemical heat engines designed to operate outside of Earth's atmosphere (e.g. rockets, deeply submerged submarines) need to carry an additional fuel component called the oxidizer (although there exist super-oxidizers suitable for use in rockets, such as fluorine, a more powerful oxidant than oxygen itself); or the application needs to obtain heat by non-chemical means, such as by means of nuclear reactions.

== Emission and byproducts ==
All chemically fueled heat engines emit exhaust gases. The cleanest engines emit only water. Strict zero-emissions generally means zero emissions other than water and water vapour. Only heat engines which combust pure hydrogen (fuel) and pure oxygen (oxidizer) achieve zero-emission by a strict definition (in practice, some rocket engines). If hydrogen is burnt in combination with air (all airbreathing engines), a side reaction between atmospheric oxygen and atmospheric nitrogen produces small amounts of NO_{x}. If a hydrocarbon (such as alcohol or gasoline) is burnt as fuel, CO_{2}, a greenhouse gas, is emitted. Hydrogen and oxygen can also be made to react and form water in a fuel cell without producing NO_{x}, but a fuel cell is a type of electrochemical device, not a heat engine.

== Terminology ==
The word engine derives from Old French engin, from the Latin ingenium–the root of the word ingenious. Pre-industrial weapons of war, such as catapults, trebuchets and battering rams, were called siege engines, and knowledge of how to construct them was often treated as a military secret. The word gin, as in cotton gin, is short for engine. Most mechanical devices invented during the Industrial Revolution were described as engines—the steam engine being a notable example. However, the original steam engines, such as those by Thomas Savery, were not mechanical engines but pumps. In this manner, a fire engine in its original form was merely a water pump, with the engine being transported to the fire by horses.

In modern usage, the term engine typically describes devices, like steam engines and internal combustion engines, that burn or otherwise consume fuel to perform mechanical work by exerting a torque or linear force (usually in the form of thrust). Devices converting heat energy into motion are commonly referred to simply as engines. Examples of engines which exert a torque include the familiar automobile gasoline and diesel engines, as well as turboshafts. Examples of engines which produce thrust include turbofans and rockets.

When the internal combustion engine was invented, the term motor was initially used to distinguish it from the steam engine—which was in wide use at the time, powering locomotives and other vehicles such as steam rollers. The term motor derives from the Latin noun mōtor which means 'that which moves something'. Thus a motor is a device that imparts motion.

Motor and engine are interchangeable in standard English. In some engineering jargons, the two words have different meanings, in which engine is a device that burns or otherwise consumes fuel, changing its chemical composition, and a motor is a device driven by electricity, air, or hydraulic pressure, which does not change the chemical composition of its energy source. However, rocketry uses the term rocket motor, even though they consume fuel.

A heat engine may also serve as a prime mover—a component that transforms the flow or changes in pressure of a fluid into mechanical energy. An automobile powered by an internal combustion engine may make use of various motors and pumps, but ultimately all such devices derive their power from the engine. Another way of looking at it is that a motor receives power from an external source, and then converts it into mechanical energy, while an engine creates power from pressure (derived directly from the explosive force of combustion or other chemical reaction, or secondarily from the action of some such force on other substances such as air, water, or steam).

== History ==
=== Antiquity ===
Simple machines, such as the club and oar (examples of the lever), are prehistoric. More complex engines using human power, animal power, water power, wind power and even steam power date back to antiquity. Human power was focused by the use of simple engines, such as the capstan, windlass or treadmill, and with ropes, pulleys, and block and tackle arrangements; this power was transmitted usually with the forces multiplied and the speed reduced. These were used in cranes and aboard ships in Ancient Greece, as well as in mines, water pumps and siege engines in Ancient Rome. The writers of those times, including Vitruvius, Frontinus and Pliny the Elder, treat these engines as commonplace, so their invention may be more ancient. By the 1st century AD, cattle and horses were used in mills, driving machines similar to those powered by humans in earlier times.

According to Strabo, a water-powered mill was built in Kaberia of the kingdom of Mithridates during the 1st century BC. Use of water wheels in mills spread throughout the Roman Empire over the next few centuries. Some were quite complex, with aqueducts, dams, and sluices to maintain and channel the water, along with systems of gears, or toothed-wheels made of wood and metal to regulate the speed of rotation. More sophisticated small devices, such as the Antikythera Mechanism used complex trains of gears and dials to act as calendars or predict astronomical events. In a poem by Ausonius in the 4th century AD, he mentions a stone-cutting saw powered by water. Hero of Alexandria is credited with many such wind and steam powered machines in the 1st century AD, including the Aeolipile and the vending machine, often these machines were associated with worship, such as animated altars and automated temple doors.

=== Medieval ===
Medieval Muslim engineers employed gears in mills and water-raising machines, and used dams as a source of water power to provide additional power to watermills and water-raising machines. In the medieval Islamic world, such advances made it possible to mechanize many industrial tasks previously carried out by manual labour.

In 1206, al-Jazari employed a crank-conrod system for two of his water-raising machines. A rudimentary steam turbine device was described by Taqi al-Din in 1551 and by Giovanni Branca in 1629.

In the 13th century, the solid rocket motor was invented in China. Driven by gunpowder, this simplest form of internal combustion engine was unable to deliver sustained power, but was useful for propelling weaponry at high speeds towards enemies in battle and for fireworks. After invention, this innovation spread throughout Europe.

=== Industrial Revolution ===
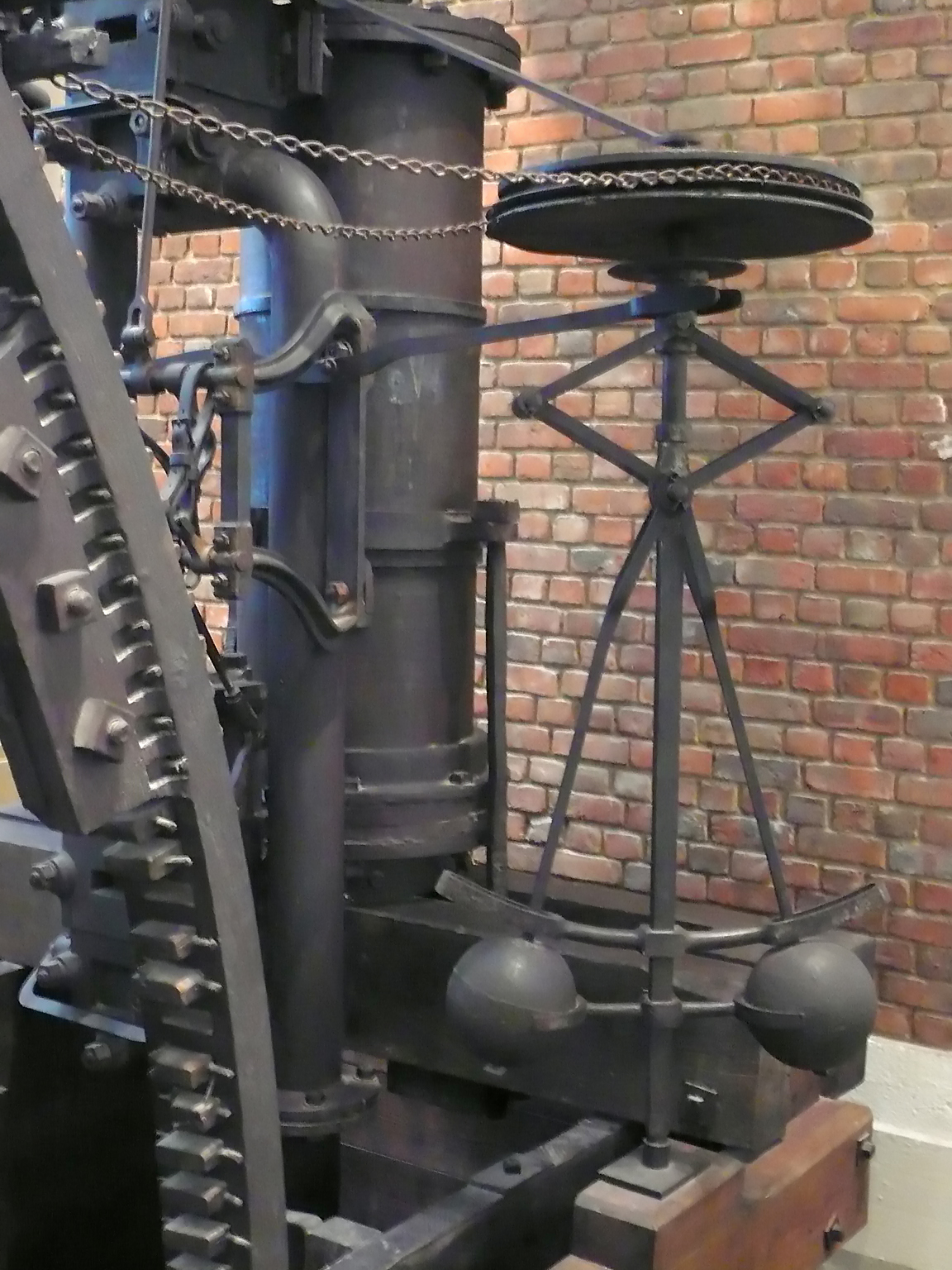
Boulton & Watt engine of 1788

The Watt steam engine was the first type of steam engine to make use of steam at a pressure just above atmospheric to drive the piston helped by a partial vacuum. Improving on the design of the 1712 Newcomen steam engine, the Watt steam engine, developed sporadically from 1763 to 1775, was a great step in the development of the steam engine. Offering a dramatic increase in fuel efficiency, James Watt's design became synonymous with steam engines, due in no small part to his business partner, Matthew Boulton. It enabled rapid development of efficient semi-automated factories on a previously unimaginable scale in places where waterpower was not available. Later development led to steam locomotives and great expansion of railway transportation.

As for internal combustion piston engines, these were tested in France in 1807 by de Rivaz and independently, by the Niépce brothers. They were theoretically advanced by Carnot in 1824. In 1853–57 Eugenio Barsanti and Felice Matteucci invented and patented an engine using the free-piston principle that was possibly the first 4-cycle engine.

The invention of an internal combustion engine which was later commercially successful was made during 1860 by Etienne Lenoir.

In 1877, the Otto cycle was capable of giving a far higher power-to-weight ratio than steam engines and worked much better for many transportation applications such as cars and aircraft.

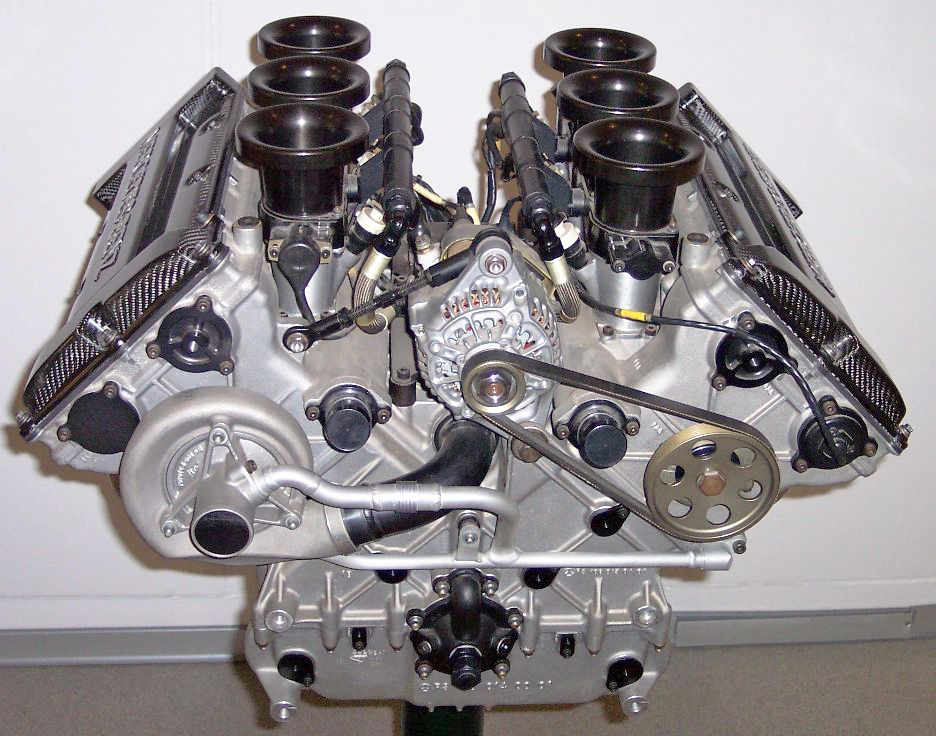
A V6 internal combustion engine from a Mercedes-Benz

=== Automobiles ===
The first commercially successful automobile, created by Karl Benz, added to the interest in light and powerful engines. The lightweight gasoline internal combustion engine, operating on a four-stroke Otto cycle, has been the most successful for light automobiles, while the thermally more-efficient Diesel engine is used for trucks and buses. During the 1990s and 2000s, diesel engines became increasingly common in European passenger cars. By 2011, 55.7% of new Western European passenger cars were registered as diesel. However, since the mid-2010s, diesel passenger cars have declined in sales; by 2024, only 16% of new passenger cars in the European Union were registered as diesel.

==== Horizontally-opposed pistons ====
In 1897, Karl Benz was granted a patent for his design of the first engine with horizontally opposed pistons. His design created an engine in which the corresponding pistons move in horizontal cylinders and reach top dead center simultaneously, thus automatically balancing each other with respect to their individual momentum. Engines of this design are often referred to as “flat” or “boxer” engines due to their shape and low profile. They were used in the Volkswagen Beetle, the Citroën 2CV, some Porsche and Subaru cars, many BMW and Honda motorcycles. Opposed four- and six-cylinder engines continue to be used as a power source in small, propeller-driven aircraft.

==== Advancement ====
The continued use of internal combustion engines in automobiles is partly due to the improvement of engine control systems, such as on-board computers providing engine management processes, and electronically controlled fuel injection. Forced air induction by turbocharging and supercharging have increased the power output of smaller displacement engines that are lighter in weight and more fuel-efficient at normal cruise power. Similar changes have been applied to smaller Diesel engines, giving them almost the same performance characteristics as gasoline engines. This is especially evident with the popularity of smaller diesel engine-propelled cars in Europe. Diesel engines produce lower hydrocarbon and CO_{2} emissions, but greater particulate and NO_{x} pollution, than gasoline engines. Diesel engines are also 40% more fuel efficient than comparable gasoline engines.

==== Increasing power ====
In the first half of the 20th century, a trend of increasing engine power occurred, particularly in the U.S. models. Design changes incorporated all known methods of increasing engine capacity, including increasing the pressure in the cylinders to improve efficiency, increasing the size of the engine, and increasing the rate at which the engine produces work. The higher forces and pressures created by these changes created engine vibration and size problems that led to stiffer, more compact engines with V and opposed cylinder layouts replacing longer straight-line arrangements.

==== Combustion efficiency ====
Optimal combustion efficiency in passenger vehicles is reached with a coolant temperature of around 110 °C (230 °F).

==== Engine configuration ====
Earlier automobile engine development produced a much larger range of engines than is in common use today. Engines have ranged from 1- to 16-cylinder designs with corresponding differences in overall size, weight, engine displacement, and cylinder bores. Four cylinders and power ratings from 19 to 120 hp (14 to 90 kW) were followed in a majority of the models. Several three-cylinder, two-stroke-cycle models were built while most engines had straight or in-line cylinders. There were several V-type models and horizontally opposed two- and four-cylinder makes too. Overhead camshafts were frequently employed. The smaller engines were commonly air-cooled and located at the rear of the vehicle; compression ratios were relatively low. The 1970s and 1980s saw an increased interest in improved fuel economy, which caused a return to smaller V-6 and four-cylinder layouts, with as many as five valves per cylinder to improve efficiency. The Bugatti Veyron 16.4 operates with a W16 engine, meaning that two V8 cylinder layouts are positioned next to each other to create the W shape sharing the same crankshaft.

The largest internal combustion engine ever built is the Wärtsilä-Sulzer RTA96-C, a 14-cylinder, 2-stroke turbocharged diesel engine that was designed to power the Emma Mærsk, the largest container ship in the world when launched in 2006. This engine has a mass of 2,300 tonnes, and when running at 102 rpm (1.7 Hz) produces over 80 MW, and can use up to 250 tonnes of fuel per day.

== Types ==
An engine can be put into a category according to two criteria: the form of energy it accepts in order to create motion, and the type of motion it outputs.

=== Heat engine ===
==== Combustion engine ====
Combustion engines are heat engines driven by the heat of a combustion process.

==== Internal combustion engine ====
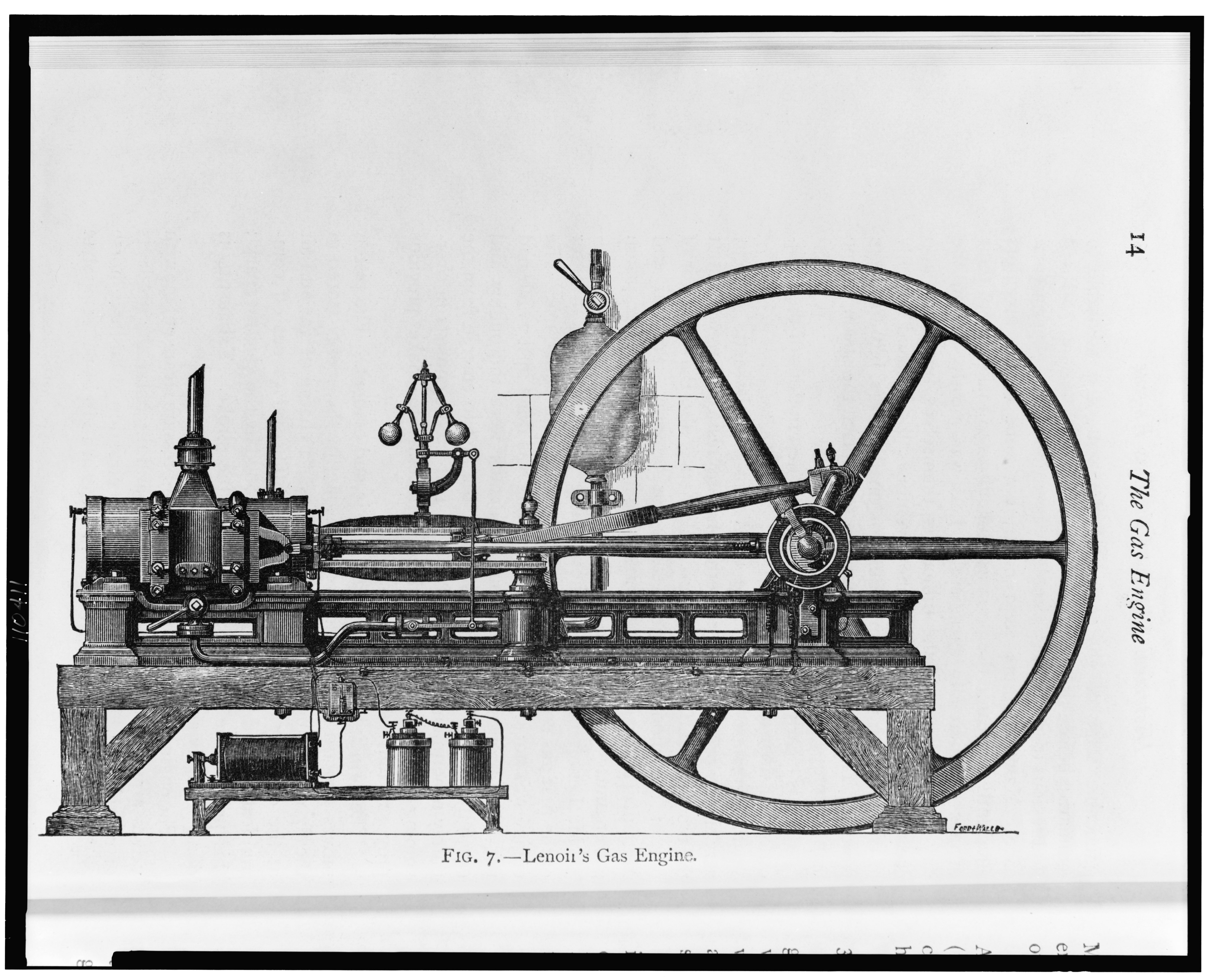
A three-horsepower internal combustion engine that ran on coal gas

The internal combustion engine is an engine in which the combustion of a fuel (generally, fossil fuel) occurs with an oxidizer (usually air) in a combustion chamber. In an internal combustion engine the expansion of the high temperature and high pressure gases, which are produced by the combustion, directly applies force to components of the engine, such as the pistons or turbine blades or a nozzle, and by moving it over a distance, generates mechanical work.

==== External combustion engine ====
An external combustion engine (EC engine) is a heat engine where an internal working fluid is heated by combustion of an external source, through the engine wall or a heat exchanger. The fluid then, by expanding and acting on the mechanism of the engine produces motion and usable work. The fluid is then cooled, compressed and reused (closed cycle), or (less commonly) dumped, and cool fluid pulled in (open cycle air engine).

"Combustion" refers to burning fuel with an oxidizer, to supply the heat. Engines of similar (or even identical) configuration and operation may use a supply of heat from other sources such as nuclear, solar, geothermal or exothermic reactions not involving combustion; but are not then strictly classed as external combustion engines, but as external thermal engines.

The working fluid can be a gas as in a Stirling engine, or steam as in a steam engine or an organic liquid such as n-pentane in an Organic Rankine cycle. The fluid can be of any composition; gas is by far the most common, although even single-phase liquid is sometimes used. In the case of the steam engine, the fluid changes phases between liquid and gas.

==== Air-breathing combustion engines ====
Air-breathing combustion engines are combustion engines that use the oxygen in atmospheric air to oxidise ('burn') the fuel, rather than carrying an oxidiser, as in a rocket. Theoretically, this should result in a better specific impulse than for rocket engines.

A continuous stream of air flows through the air-breathing engine. This air is then compressed, mixed with fuel, ignited and expelled as the exhaust gas. In reaction engines, the majority of the combustion energy (heat) exits the engine as exhaust gas, which provides thrust directly.

Examples

Typical air-breathing engines include:

- Reciprocating engine
- Steam engine
- Gas turbine
- Airbreathing jet engine
- Turbo-propeller engine
- Pulse detonation engine
- Pulse jet
- Ramjet
- Scramjet
- Liquid air cycle engine/Reaction Engines SABRE.

==== Environmental effects ====
The operation of engines typically has a negative impact upon air quality and ambient sound levels. There has been a growing emphasis on the pollution producing features of automotive power systems. This has created new interest in alternate power sources and internal-combustion engine refinements. Though a few limited-production battery-powered electric vehicles have appeared, they have not proved competitive owing to costs and operating characteristics. In the 21st century the diesel engine has been increasing in popularity with automobile owners. However, the gasoline engine and the Diesel engine, with their new emission-control devices to improve emission performance, have not yet been significantly challenged. A number of manufacturers have introduced hybrid engines, mainly involving a small gasoline engine coupled with an electric motor and with a large battery bank, these are starting to become a popular option because of their environment awareness.

==== Air quality ====
Exhaust gas from a spark ignition engine consists of the following: nitrogen 70 to 75% (by volume), water vapor 10 to 12%, carbon dioxide 10 to 13.5%, hydrogen 0.5 to 2%, oxygen 0.2 to 2%, carbon monoxide: 0.1 to 6%, unburnt hydrocarbons and partial oxidation products (e.g. aldehydes) 0.5 to 1%, nitrogen monoxide 0.01 to 0.4%, nitrous oxide <100 ppm, sulfur dioxide 15 to 60 ppm, traces of other compounds such as fuel additives and lubricants, also halogen and metallic compounds, and other particles. Carbon monoxide is highly toxic, and can cause carbon monoxide poisoning, so it is important to avoid any build-up of the gas in a confined space. Catalytic converters can reduce toxic emissions, but not eliminate them. Also, resulting greenhouse gas emissions, chiefly carbon dioxide, from the widespread use of engines in the modern industrialized world is contributing to the global greenhouse effect – a primary concern regarding global warming.

==== Non-combusting heat engines ====
Some engines convert heat from noncombustive processes into mechanical work, for example a nuclear power plant uses the heat from the nuclear reaction to produce steam and drive a steam engine, or a gas turbine in a rocket engine may be driven by decomposing hydrogen peroxide. Apart from the different energy source, the engine is often engineered much the same as an internal or external combustion engine.

Another group of noncombustive engines includes thermoacoustic heat engines (sometimes called "TA engines") which are thermoacoustic devices that use high-amplitude sound waves to pump heat from one place to another, or conversely use a heat difference to induce high-amplitude sound waves. In general, thermoacoustic engines can be divided into standing wave and travelling wave devices.

Stirling engines can be another form of non-combustive heat engine. They use the Stirling thermodynamic cycle to convert heat into work. An example is the alpha type Stirling engine, whereby gas flows, via a recuperator, between a hot cylinder and a cold cylinder, which are attached to reciprocating pistons 90° out of phase. The gas receives heat at the hot cylinder and expands, driving the piston that turns the crankshaft. After expanding and flowing through the recuperator, the gas rejects heat at the cold cylinder and the ensuing pressure drop leads to its compression by the other (displacement) piston, which forces it back to the hot cylinder.

=== Non-thermal chemically powered motor ===
Non-thermal motors usually are powered by a chemical reaction, but are not heat engines. Examples include:

- Molecular motor – motors found in living things
- Synthetic molecular motor.

=== Electric motor ===
An electric motor uses electrical energy to produce mechanical energy, usually through the interaction of magnetic fields and current-carrying conductors. The reverse process, producing electrical energy from mechanical energy, is accomplished by a generator or dynamo. Traction motors used on vehicles often perform both tasks. Electric motors can be run as generators and vice versa, although this is not always practical. Electric motors are ubiquitous, being found in applications as diverse as industrial fans, blowers and pumps, machine tools, household appliances, power tools, and disk drives. They may be powered by direct current (for example a battery powered portable device or motor vehicle), or by alternating current from a central electrical distribution grid. The smallest motors may be found in electric wristwatches. Medium-size motors of highly standardized dimensions and characteristics provide convenient mechanical power for industrial uses. The very largest electric motors are used for propulsion of large ships, and for such purposes as pipeline compressors, with ratings in the thousands of kilowatts. Electric motors may be classified by the source of electric power, by their internal construction, and by their application.

Electric motor

The physical principle of producing mechanical motion through the interaction of an electric current and a magnetic field was demonstrated by Michael Faraday in 1821.Electric motors of increasing efficiency were constructed throughout the 19th century, but their commercial exploitation on a large scale required the development of efficient electrical generators and power distribution networks.

To reduce the electric energy consumption from motors and their associated carbon footprints, various regulatory authorities in many countries have introduced and implemented legislation to encourage the manufacture and use of higher efficiency electric motors. A well-designed motor can convert over 90% of its input energy into useful power for decades. When the efficiency of a motor is raised by even a few percentage points, the savings, in kilowatt hours (and therefore in cost), are enormous. The electrical energy efficiency of a typical industrial induction motor can be improved by: 1) reducing the electrical losses in the stator windings (e.g., by increasing the cross-sectional area of the conductor, improving the winding technique, and using materials with higher electrical conductivities, such as copper), 2) reducing the electrical losses in the rotor coil or casting (e.g., by using materials with higher electrical conductivities, such as copper), 3) reducing magnetic losses by using better quality magnetic steel, 4) improving the aerodynamics of motors to reduce mechanical windage losses, 5) improving bearings to reduce friction losses, and 6) minimizing manufacturing tolerances. See Premium efficiency for further discussion.

By convention, electric engine refers to a railroad electric locomotive, rather than an electric motor.

=== Physically powered motor ===
Some motors are powered by potential or kinetic energy, for example some funiculars, gravity plane and ropeway conveyors have used the energy from moving water or rocks, and some clocks have a weight that falls under gravity. Other forms of potential energy include compressed gases (such as pneumatic motors), springs (clockwork motors) and elastic bands.

Historic military siege engines included large catapults, trebuchets, and (to some extent) battering rams were powered by potential energy.

==== Pneumatic motor ====
A pneumatic motor is a machine that converts potential energy in the form of compressed air into mechanical work. Pneumatic motors generally convert the compressed air to mechanical work through either linear or rotary motion. Linear motion can come from either a diaphragm or a piston actuator, while rotary motion is supplied by either a vane type air motor or piston air motor. Pneumatic motors have found widespread success in the hand-held tool industry and continual attempts are being made to expand their use to the transportation industry. However, pneumatic motors must overcome efficiency deficiencies before being seen as a viable option in the transportation industry.

==== Hydraulic motor ====
A hydraulic motor derives its power from a pressurized liquid. This type of engine is used to move heavy loads and drive machinery.

==== Hybrid ====
Some motor units can have multiple sources of energy. For example, a plug-in hybrid electric vehicle's electric motor could source electricity from either a battery or from fossil fuels inputs via an internal combustion engine and a generator.

== Performance ==
The following are used in the assessment of the performance of an engine.

=== Speed ===
Speed refers to crankshaft rotation in piston engines and the speed of compressor/turbine rotors and electric motor rotors. It is typically measured in revolutions per minute (rpm).

=== Thrust ===
Thrust is the force exerted on an airplane as a consequence of its propeller or jet engine accelerating the air passing through it. It is also the force exerted on a ship as a consequence of its propeller accelerating the water passing through it.

=== Torque ===
Torque is a turning moment on a shaft and is calculated by multiplying the force causing the moment by its distance from the shaft.

=== Power ===
Power is the measure of how fast work is done.

=== Efficiency ===
Efficiency is a proportion of useful energy output compared to total input.

=== Sound levels ===
Vehicle noise is predominantly from the engine at low vehicle speeds and from tires and the air flowing past the vehicle at higher speeds. Electric motors are quieter than internal combustion engines. Thrust-producing engines, such as turbofans, turbojets and rockets emit the greatest amount of noise due to the way their thrust-producing, high-velocity exhaust streams interact with the surrounding stationary air. Noise reduction technology includes intake and exhaust system mufflers (silencers) on gasoline and diesel engines and noise attenuation liners in turbofan inlets.

== Engines by use ==
Particularly notable kinds of engines include:

- Aircraft engine
- Automobile engine
- Model engine
- Motorcycle engine
- Marine propulsion engines such as Outboard motor
- Non-road engine is the term used to define engines that are not used by vehicles on roadways.
- Railway locomotive engine
- Spacecraft propulsion engines such as Rocket engine
- Traction engine

== See also ==
- Aircraft engine
- Automobile engine replacement
- Electric motor
- Engine cooling
- Engine swap
- Gasoline engine
- HCCI engine
- Hesselman engine
- Hot bulb engine
- IRIS engine
- Micromotor
  - Flagella – biological motor used by some microorganisms
  - Nanomotor
  - Molecular motor
  - Synthetic molecular motor
  - Adiabatic quantum motor
- Multifuel
- Reaction engine
- Solid-state engine
- Timeline of heat engine technology
- Timeline of motor and engine technology
