= Karl-Heinz Ernst =

Swiss-German chemist (born 1959)

Karl-Heinz Ernst (born 17 December 1959 in Northeim) is a German-Swiss physical chemist and surface scientist. His research focuses in particular on molecular chirality at surfaces, two-dimensional self-assembly, surface stereochemistry, and single-molecule dynamics. He was a long-standing research group leader at the Swiss Federal Laboratories for Materials Science and Technology (Empa) in Dübendorf and Adjunct Professor of Chemistry at the University of Zurich. Since his retirement, he has remained active in research, including at the Institute of Physics of the Czech Academy of Sciences in Prague.

== Academic career ==
Ernst initially trained as a chemical technical assistant. He subsequently studied chemical engineering at the Technische Fachhochschule Berlin and chemistry at the Free University of Berlin. In his diploma thesis in 1985, he investigated the interaction of glycine with a Pt(111) surface, thus working at an early stage on the adsorption of biologically relevant molecules on well-defined single-crystal surfaces under ultra-high-vacuum conditions.

His doctoral research in physical chemistry at the Free University of Berlin focused on the adsorption of hydrogen on a cobalt surface (2nd thesis supervisor: Gerhard Ertl). Following postdoctoral research at the University of Washington in Seattle, Ernst joined Empa in Dübendorf in 1992.

At Empa, he established a research group in molecular surface science. His research encompassed the structure and dynamics of molecular adsorbates, molecular self-assembly, chirality in two-dimensional systems, and the manipulation of individual molecules by scanning tunneling microscopy.

Ernst completed his habilitation at the University of Zurich in 2007 and was appointed Adjunct Professor of Chemistry there in 2010. He is among the few surface scientists invited to lecture at the Bürgenstock Conference on Stereochemistry. In 2014, Empa appointed him Distinguished Senior Researcher. Research stays took him, among other institutions, to the University of California, Berkeley, the University of Washington in Seattle, the Chinese Academy of Sciences in Beijing, and the IBM Almaden Research Center in California. Since 2019, he has also been a Senior Scientist at the Institute of Physics of the Czech Academy of Sciences in Prague.

== Research ==
=== Molecular chirality at surfaces ===
A major focus of Ernst's research is molecular chirality at solid surfaces, particularly its influence on adsorption and two-dimensional self-assembly. His work includes enantiomeric recognition, spontaneous symmetry breaking, and the amplification of chiral information. This includes the transfer of the “sergeants-and-soldiers” principle to two-dimensional molecular layers, in which a small number of chiral molecules can determine the handedness of a larger number of prochiral molecules.

Another class of molecules extensively studied by Ernst is helicenes. These molecules, composed of fused aromatic rings, exhibit pronounced molecular chirality as a consequence of their helical structure. Later work also addressed the interaction between chiral molecules and electron spin and the enantioselective adsorption of helicenes on magnetic surfaces.

=== Single-molecule motion and molecular motors ===
Ernst also investigated tunnel-current-induced motion of individual moleculesas a form of molecular motor. In 2011, he and Ben Feringa published a study in Nature on a four-motor molecule on a copper surface. The study demonstrated the electrically driven directional motion of an individual synthetic molecule on a metal surface.

== Awards and honors ==
- 2014: Appointment as Distinguished Senior Researcher at Empa
- 2022: Microbeam Analysis Award of the Japan Society of Vacuum and Surface Science
- 2024: SASP Erwin Schrödinger Gold Medal for scientific contributions to surface science, stereochemistry, chirality, and nanomaterials
- 2025: Surface Structure Prize of the International Conference on the Structure of Surfaces (ICSOS) for work on chiral molecules and chiral structures at surfaces

== Selected publications ==
- with M. Parschau and S. Romer: “Induction of homochirality in achiral enantiomorphous monolayers.” Journal of the American Chemical Society, vol. 126, 2004, pp. 15398–15399.
- with R. Fasel and M. Parschau: “Amplification of chirality in two-dimensional enantiomorphous lattices.” Nature, vol. 439, 2006, pp. 449–452.
- with M. Parschau, K.-H. Rieder and H. J. Hug: “Switching the Chirality of Single Adsorbates.” Angewandte Chemie International Edition, vol. 48, 2009, pp. 4065–4069.
- with T. Kudernac, N. Ruangsupapichat, M. Parschau, B. Maciá, N. Katsonis, S. R. Harutyunyan and B. L. Feringa: “Electrically driven directional motion of a four-wheeled molecule on a metal surface.” Nature, vol. 479, 2011, pp. 208–211.
- “Stereochemical Recognition of Helicenes on Metal Surfaces.” Accounts of Chemical Research, vol. 49, 2016, pp. 1182–1190.
- “The stereochemistry of 1,4-dicarboxylic acids on Cu(110): sergeants & soldiers, surface explosions and chiral reconstructions.” Surface Science, vol. 749, 2024, 122569.
- with M. R. Safari, F. Matthes, V. Caciuc, N. Atodiresei, C. M. Schneider and D. Bürgler: “Enantioselective adsorption on magnetic surfaces.” Advanced Materials, vol. 36, 2024, 2308666.
- with J. Voigt, K. Martin, M. Baljozović, C. Wäckerlin and N. Avarvari: “An aperiodic chiral tiling by topological molecular self-assembly.” Nature Communications, vol. 16, 2025, 83.
- with E. Isufi Neziri, C. Hensky, H. Q. Le, D. Radillo Ochoa, A. Cebrat, M. Parschau and C. Wäckerlin: “Two-dimensional metalorganic ferromagnets.” Advanced Science, vol. 12, 2025, 2415266.
