= Synthetic molecular motor =

Man-made molecular machines

Molecular dynamics simulation of a synthetic molecular rotor composed of three molecules in a nanopore (outer diameter 6.7 nm) at 250 K.

Synthetic molecular motors are molecular machines capable of continuous directional rotation under an energy input. Although the term "molecular motor" has traditionally referred to a naturally occurring protein that induces motion (via protein dynamics), some groups also use the term when referring to non-biological, non-peptide synthetic motors. Many chemists are pursuing the synthesis of such molecular motors.

The basic requirements for a synthetic motor are repetitive 360° motion, the consumption of energy and unidirectional rotation. The first two efforts in this direction, the chemically driven motor by Dr. T. Ross Kelly of Boston College with co-workers and the light-driven motor by Ben Feringa and co-workers, were published in 1999 in the same issue of Nature.

As of 2020, the smallest atomically precise molecular machine has a rotor that consists of four atoms.

== Chemically driven rotary molecular motors ==
An example of a prototype for a synthetic chemically driven rotary molecular motor was reported by Kelly and co-workers in 1999. Their system is made up from a three-bladed triptycene rotor and a helicene, and is capable of performing a unidirectional 120° rotation.

This rotation takes place in five steps. The amine group present on the triptycene moiety is converted to an isocyanate group by condensation with phosgene (a). Thermal or spontaneous rotation around the central bond then brings the isocyanate group in proximity of the hydroxyl group located on the helicene moiety (b), thereby allowing these two groups to react with each other (c). This reaction irreversibly traps the system as a strained cyclic urethane that is higher in energy and thus energetically closer to the rotational energy barrier than the original state. Further rotation of the triptycene moiety therefore requires only a relatively small amount of thermal activation in order to overcome this barrier, thereby releasing the strain (d). Finally, cleavage of the urethane group restores the amine and alcohol functionalities of the molecule (e).

The result of this sequence of events is a unidirectional 120° rotation of the triptycene moiety with respect to the helicene moiety. Additional forward or backward rotation of the triptycene rotor is inhibited by the helicene moiety, which serves a function similar to that of the pawl of a ratchet. The unidirectionality of the system is a result from both the asymmetric skew of the helicene moiety as well as the strain of the cyclic urethane which is formed in c. This strain can be only be lowered by the clockwise rotation of the triptycene rotor in d, as both counterclockwise rotation as well as the inverse process of d are energetically unfavorable. In this respect the preference for the rotation direction is determined by both the positions of the functional groups and the shape of the helicene and is thus built into the design of the molecule instead of dictated by external factors.

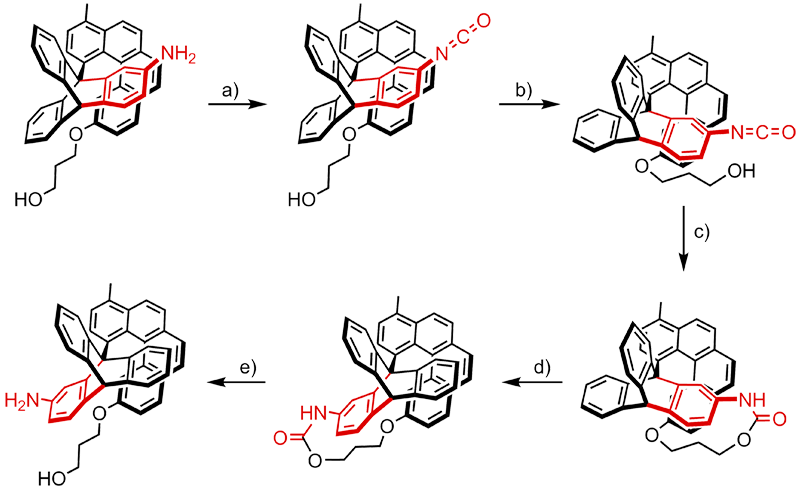
The prototype of a chemically driven rotary molecular motor by Kelly and co-workers.

The motor by Kelly and co-workers is an elegant example of how chemical energy can be used to induce controlled, unidirectional rotational motion, a process which resembles the consumption of ATP in organisms in order to fuel numerous processes. However, it does suffer from a serious drawback: the sequence of events that leads to 120° rotation is not repeatable. Kelly and co-workers have therefore searched for ways to extend the system so that this sequence can be carried out repeatedly. Unfortunately, their attempts to accomplish this objective have not been successful and currently the project has been abandoned. In 2016 David Leigh's group invented the first autonomous chemically-fuelled synthetic molecular motor.

Some other examples of synthetic chemically driven rotary molecular motors that all operate by sequential addition of reagents have been reported, including the use of the stereoselective ring opening of a racemic biaryl lactone by the use of chiral reagents, which results in a directed 90° rotation of one aryl with respect to the other aryl. Branchaud and co-workers have reported that this approach, followed by an additional ring closing step, can be used to accomplish a non-repeatable 180° rotation.

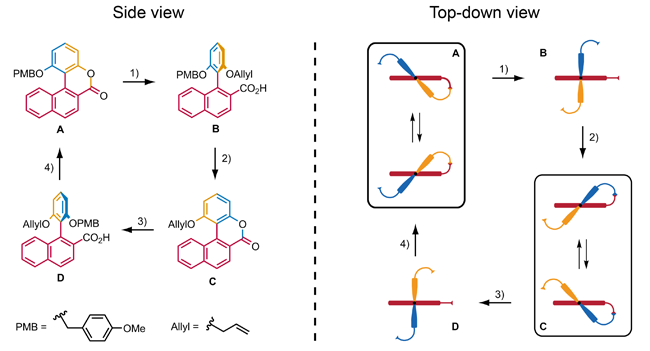
The chemically driven rotary molecular motor by Feringa and co-workers

Feringa and co-workers used this approach in their design of a molecule that can repeatably perform 360° rotation. The full rotation of this molecular motor takes place in four stages. In stages A and C rotation of the aryl moiety is restricted, although helix inversion is possible. In stages B and D the aryl can rotate with respect to the naphthalene with steric interactions preventing the aryl from passing the naphthalene. The rotary cycle consists of four chemically induced steps which realize the conversion of one stage into the next. Steps 1 and 3 are asymmetric ring opening reactions which make use of a chiral reagent in order to control the direction of the rotation of the aryl. Steps 2 and 4 consist of the deprotection of the phenol, followed by regioselective ring formation.

== Light-driven rotary molecular motors ==
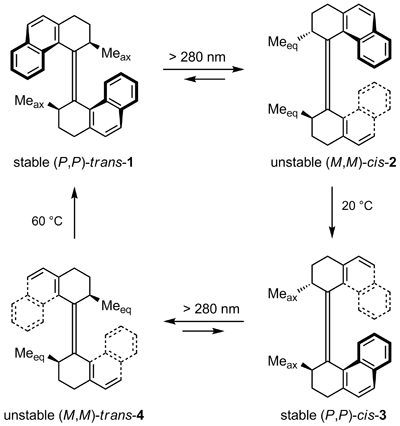
Rotary cycle of the light-driven rotary molecular motor by Feringa and co-workers.

In 1999 the laboratory of Prof. Dr. Ben L. Feringa at the University of Groningen, The Netherlands, reported the creation of a unidirectional molecular rotor. Their 360° molecular motor system consists of a bis-helicene connected by an alkene double bond displaying axial chirality and having two stereocenters.

One cycle of unidirectional rotation takes 4 reaction steps. The first step is a low temperature endothermic photoisomerization of the trans (P,P) isomer 1 to the cis (M,M) 2 where P stands for the right-handed helix and M for the left-handed helix. In this process, the two axial methyl groups are converted into two less sterically favorable equatorial methyl groups.

By increasing the temperature to 20 °C these methyl groups convert back exothermally to the (P,P) cis axial groups (3) in a helix inversion. Because the axial isomer is more stable than the equatorial isomer, reverse rotation is blocked. A second photoisomerization converts (P,P) cis 3 into (M,M) trans 4, again with accompanying formation of sterically unfavorable equatorial methyl groups. A thermal isomerization process at 60 °C closes the 360° cycle back to the axial positions.

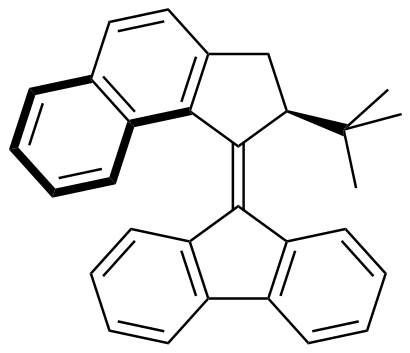
Synthetic molecular motors: fluorene system

A major hurdle to overcome is the long reaction time for complete rotation in these systems, which does not compare to rotation speeds displayed by motor proteins in biological systems. In the fastest system to date, with a fluorene lower half, the half-life of the thermal helix inversion is 0.005 seconds. This compound is synthesized using the Barton-Kellogg reaction. In this molecule the slowest step in its rotation, the thermally induced helix-inversion, is believed to proceed much more quickly because the larger tert-butyl group makes the unstable isomer even less stable than when the methyl group is used. This is because the unstable isomer is more destabilized than the transition state that leads to helix-inversion. The different behaviour of the two molecules is illustrated by the fact that the half-life time for the compound with a methyl group instead of a tert-butyl group is 3.2 minutes.

The Feringa principle has been incorporated into a prototype nanocar. The car synthesized has a helicene-derived engine with an oligo (phenylene ethynylene) chassis and four carborane wheels and is expected to be able to move on a solid surface with scanning tunneling microscopy monitoring, although so far this has not been observed. The motor does not perform with fullerene wheels because they quench the photochemistry of the motor moiety. Feringa motors have also been shown to remain operable when chemically attached to solid surfaces. The ability of certain Feringa systems to act as an asymmetric catalyst has also been demonstrated.

In 2016, Feringa was awarded a Nobel prize for his work on molecular motors.

== Experimental demonstration of a single-molecule electric motor ==
A single-molecule electrically operated motor made from a single molecule of n-butyl methyl sulfide (C_{5}H_{12}S) has been reported. The molecule is adsorbed onto a copper (111) single-crystal piece by chemisorption.

== See also ==
- Molecular machine
- Molecular motors
- Molecular propeller
- Nanomotor
