= Ben Feringa =

Dutch Nobel laureate in chemistry

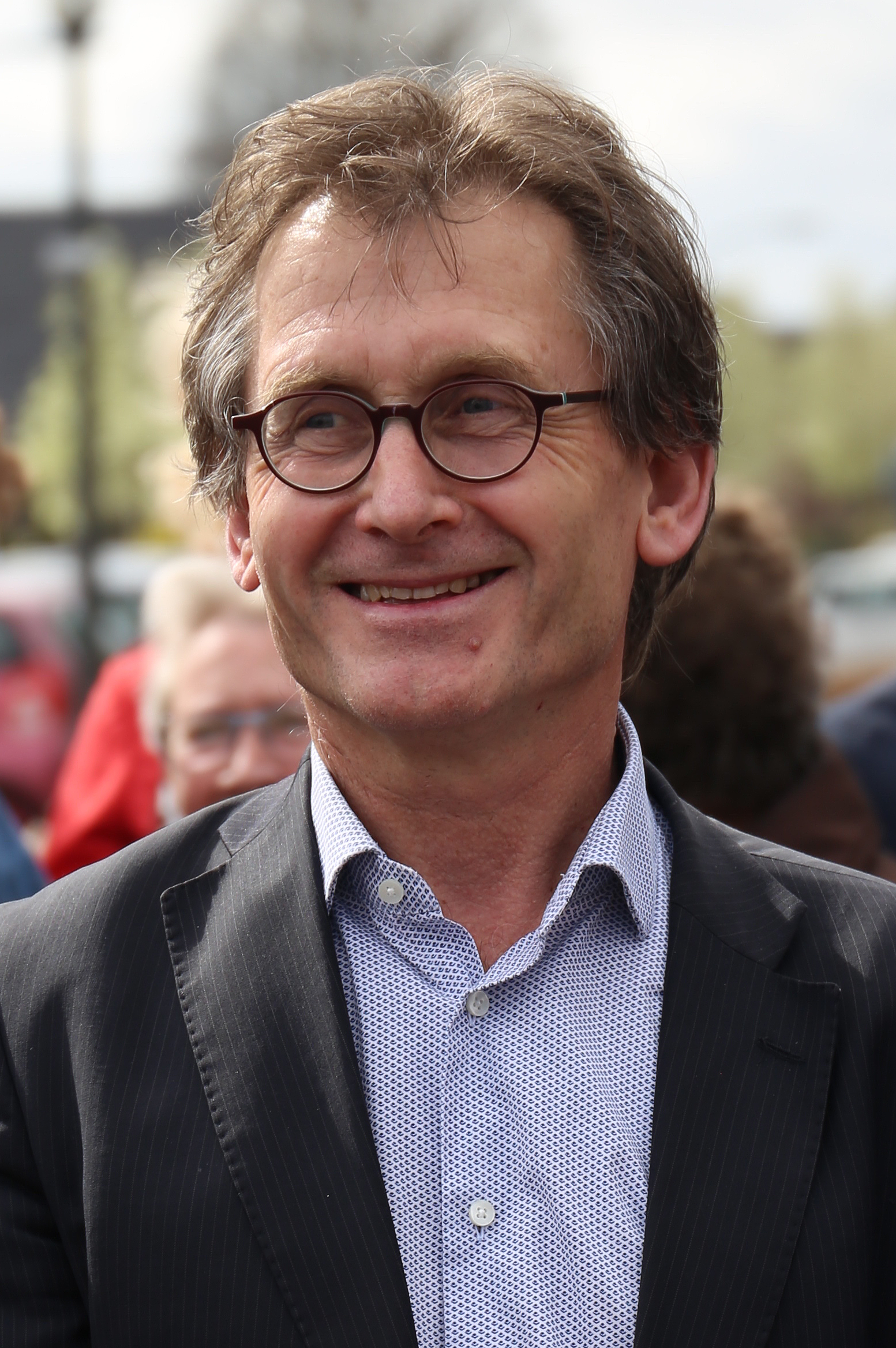
- Ben Feringa in 2017
- Born: Bernard Lucas Feringa; 18 May 1951 (age 75); Barger-Compascuum, Netherlands
- Education: University of Groningen
- Known for: Molecular switches/motors, Homogeneous catalysis, stereochemistry, photochemistry
- Spouse: Betty Feringa
- Awards: Nobel Prize in Chemistry (2016)
- Scientific career
- Fields: Organic Chemistry; Materials Science; Nanotechnology; Photochemistry
- Workplaces: University of Groningen (1984–present); Royal Dutch Shell (1979–1984)
- Thesis: Asymmetric oxidation of phenols. Atropisomerism and optical activity (1978)
- Doctoral advisor: Hans Wijnberg
- Website: benferinga.com

Bernard Lucas "Ben" Feringa (Dutch pronunciation: [ˈbɛrnɑrt ˈlykɑz bɛn ˈfeːrɪŋɣaː]; born 18 May 1951) is a Dutch synthetic organic chemist who specializes in molecular nanotechnology and homogeneous catalysis. He is the Jacobus van 't Hoff Distinguished Professor of Molecular Sciences at the Stratingh Institute for Chemistry, University of Groningen; and an Academy professor of the Royal Netherlands Academy of Arts and Sciences. Feringa's research on molecular machines was awarded the 2016 Nobel Prize in Chemistry alongside Sir J. Fraser Stoddart and Jean-Pierre Sauvage.

== Personal life ==
Feringa was born as the son of farmer Geert Feringa (1918–1993) and his wife Lies Feringa née Hake (1924–2013). Feringa was the second of ten siblings in a Catholic family. He spent his youth on the family's farm, which is directly on the border with Germany, in Barger-Compascuum in the Bourtange moor. He is of Dutch and German descent. Among his ancestors is the settler Johann Gerhard Bekel. Together with his wife Betty Feringa, he has three daughters. He lives in Paterswolde near Groningen.

== Career ==
Feringa received his MSc degree with distinction from the University of Groningen in 1974. He subsequently obtained a PhD degree at the same university in 1978, with the thesis titled "Asymmetric oxidation of phenols. Atropisomerism and optical activity". Following a short period at Shell in the Netherlands and the United Kingdom, he was appointed as lecturer at the University of Groningen in 1984 and Full Professor, succeeding Prof Wijnberg, in 1988. His early career was focused on homogenous catalysis and oxidation catalysis, and especially on stereochemistry with major contributions in the field of enantioselective catalysis, including the monophos ligand used in asymmetric hydrogenation, asymmetric conjugate additions of organometallic reagents, including the highly reactive organolithium reagents and organic photochemistry and stereochemistry. In the 1990s, Feringa's work in stereochemistry led to major contributions in photochemistry, resulting in the first monodirectional light driven molecular rotary motor and later a molecular car (a so-called nanocar) driven by electrical impulses.

Ben Feringa holds over 30 patents and has published over 650 peer reviewed research papers to date, cited more than 30,000 times and has an h-index in excess of 90. He has guided over 100 PhD students over his career.

== Contributions to research ==
Feringa found that the early introduction of chiroptical molecular switches, based on the design of the first chiral overcrowded alkenes and the demonstration of optically controlled molecular switching and amplification of chirality in mesoscopic systems, leads to molecular rotary motors in which chirality plays a critical role in achieving the same function achieved by nature, for example, the unidirectional rotation of retinal in rhodopsin. This work led to the discovery of the world's first unidirectional molecular rotary motor and this work has been laying the ground-work for a key component of future molecular nanotechnology i.e. nanomachines and nanorobots powered by molecular motors. Feringa's research has shown that molecular motors can be used to control and direct the functions of a chemical system, such as changing both the speed and enantioselectivity of a molecular catalyst.

Applications of molecular switches developed in his group include responsive materials and surfaces, liquid crystals, electrochromic devices for optoelectronics, photo-switchable DNA as a molecular memory stick, responsive gels, polymers, and light-switchable protein channels for nanoscale drug delivery systems, anion sensing, responsive catalysts and photopharmacology as well as entirely novel approaches using responsive drugs toward anticancer agents, antibiotic treatment and antibiotic resistance, and biofilm formation. Interfacing molecular motors with the macroscopic world by surface assembly on gold nanoparticles and a macroscopic gold film, has shown that the motor functions while chemically bound to a surface, a key result for future nanomachines such as a molecular conveyor belt. Experiments that involve doping liquid crystals with molecular motors demonstrate that the motion of the motor can be harnessed to make macroscopic objects rotate on a liquid crystal film and drive molecular systems out-of-equilibrium. Several of these discoveries were selected for the list of most important chemical discoveries of the year by Chemical & Engineering News.

Aside from molecular motors and switches, Feringa's work has crossed many disciplines and includes the use of phosphoramidites as ligands in asymmetric catalysis, an excellent stereocontrol was achieved in copper-catalysed C–C bond formation, which led to a breakthrough in catalytic asymmetric conjugate addition. As phosphoramidites found use in industry, recently they utilised them as starting reagents for asymmetric C-P bond formation. Traditionally, an external chiral ligand is used for chiral induction in a C–P coupling reaction, but the competitive coordination of initial and final phosphorus compounds with the metal catalysts, together with an external chiral ligand, reduces the enantioselectivity. As BINOL-containing phosphoramidites have the properties of an intrinsic chiral ligand and simultaneously can serve as a substrate, they hypothesized that they would increase stereoselectivity in C–P coupling processes with aryl compounds, and were delighted when that data confirmed that they did.

Moreover, many other highlighted works are chiral electromagnetic radiation to generate enantioselectivity, low molecular weight gelators, imaging porphyrins with STM, drying induced self-assembly, organic synthesis, CD spectroscopy, asymmetric catalysis, exploring the origins of chirality including the possibility of an extraterrestrial source and various aspects of surface science including surface modification, surface energy control, and porphyrin allayers.

== Honours and awards ==
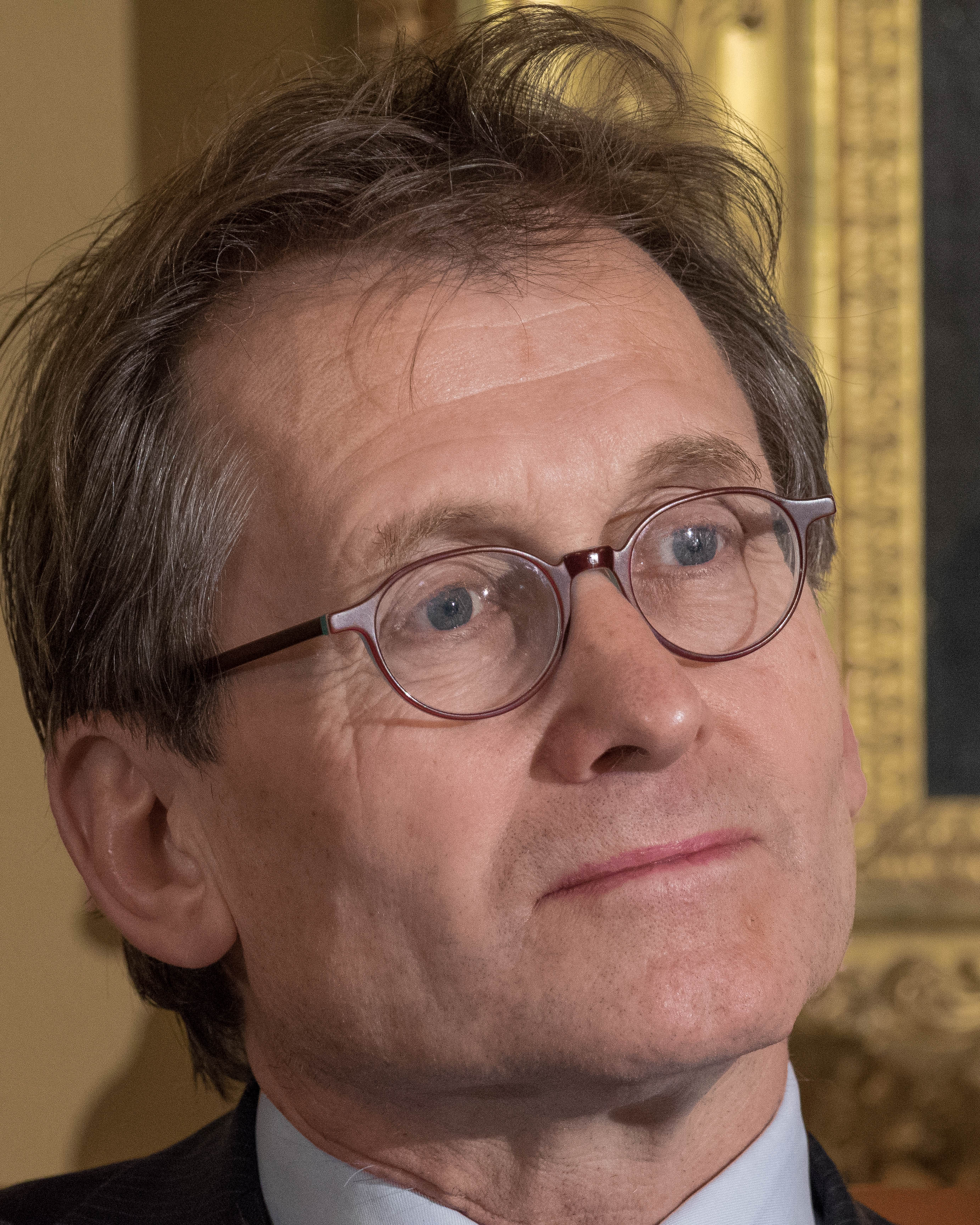
Feringa at Nobel press conference in Stockholm, Sweden, December 2016

Feringa is a member of many chemical and scientific related societies: In 1998, Feringa was elected as a Fellow of the Royal Society of Chemistry (FRSC). In 2004, he was elected International Honorary Member of the American Academy of Arts and Sciences. Feringa is an elected member, since 2006, and Academy Professor, since 2008, of the Royal Netherlands Academy of Arts and Sciences (KNAW). At the KNAW Feringa served as vice-president and Chair of Board of the Science Division. In addition, Feringa is a former president of the Bürgenstock Conference in 2009, Switzerland, and an elected Member of the Academia Europaea since 2010. In 2013, he was appointed as Council Member of the Royal Society of Chemistry. On 13 October 2016, Feringa was elected an Honorary Member of the Royal Netherlands Chemical Society.

In recognition of his contributions to synthetic methodologies and catalysis, Feringa was given the Novartis Chemistry Lectureship Award 2000–2001. A large part of Feringa's research career has focused on molecular nanotechnology and especially molecular photochemistry and stereochemistry. His contributions in these areas have been recognized in research awards including Körber European Science Prize in 2003, the Spinoza Prize in 2004, and the Prelog Gold Medal in 2005 (ETH-Zürich), Switzerland, He won the James Flack Norris Award in Physical Organic Chemistry of the American Chemical Society in 2007, USA, the European Research Council Advanced Grant in 2008, and the Paracelsus Award of the Swiss Chemical Society, in 2008.

Feringa furthermore was awarded the Chirality Medal for distinguished contributions to all aspects of stereochemistry in 2010, the Solvias Ligand Contest Award (shared with John Hartwig, Yale University (US), the Organic Stereochemistry Award in 2011 of the Royal Society of Chemistry, UK, and the Decennial Van‘t Hoff Medal in 2011 of the Genootschap ter Bevordering van de Natuur-, Genees-, en Heelkunde, in the Netherlands.

Feringa's contributions to the molecular sciences have been recognized with the Arthur C. Cope Scholar Award, the Nagoya Medal of Organic Chemistry, the 2012 Grand Prix Scientifique Cino del Duca, and the Humboldt award of the Alexander von Humboldt Foundation in 2012, Germany.

In 2013, he won subsequently the Lily European Distinguished Science Award, the Nagoya Gold Medal in Nagoya, Japan, the Yamada-Koga Award in Tokyo, Japan, the Royal Society of Chemistry Award for distinguished service, and the Marie Curie Medal of the Polish Chemical Society.

He has written several invited review articles and book chapters for a number of journals and books including Chemical Reviews, Accounts of Chemical Research, Angewandte and the main textbook in the field of circular dichroism, Comprehensive Chiroptical Spectroscopy.

He won the Theodor Föster Award of the German Chemical Society (GDCh) & Bunsen-Society for Physical Chemistry in 2014, Germany, and the Arthur C. Cope Late Career Scholars Award of the American Chemical Society in 2015. In November 2015, he was the recipient of the "Chemistry for the future Solvay prize", which was awarded for "his work on groundbreaking research on molecular motors, a research field that paves the way to new therapeutic and technological applications with nanorobots."

On 20 December 2016, Feringa jointly received the Nobel Prize in Chemistry, together with Sir J. Fraser Stoddart and Jean-Pierre Sauvage, for their work on molecular machines. Feringa had been considered a candidate for the Nobel Prize for some time, with The Simpsons including him in a list of candidates in 2010. In 2016, he also received the Hoffman Medal of the German Chemical Society and the Tetrahedron Prize awarded by Elsevier. In 2017, Feringa received the Centenary Prize of the Royal Society of Chemistry. In August 2018, Feringa was awarded the European Gold Medal presented by the European Chemical Society (EuChemS) during the 7th EuChemS Chemistry Congress, held in Liverpool, UK. In 2019, Feringa accepted the Raman Chair of the Indian Academy of Sciences, an honorary position whereby eminent scientists are invited to lecture on their work and interact with the research community in India.

In 2008, he was appointed a Knight of the Order of the Netherlands Lion by Queen Beatrix of the Netherlands, and on 23 November 2016 he was promoted to Commander of the same Order by King Willem-Alexander of the Netherlands. On 1 December 2016 Feringa was made an Honorary Citizen of Groningen. On 6 April 2017 a street in his birthplace Barger-Compascuum was named Prof. Dr. B. L. Feringadam.

In 1997, he completed the 200 km Elfstedentocht in 12 hours.

He was elected a foreign associate of the US National Academy of Sciences in April 2019.

On 2 April 2019, Ben Feringa was conferred an honorary doctoral degree by the University of Johannesburg in recognition of his contributions to the Chemistry field and Scientific community as a whole.

In 2019 he became a member of the German Academy of Sciences Leopoldina.

He was elected a Foreign Member of the Royal Society in 2020.

== Professional activities ==
Ben Feringa has served as an editorial board member for several journals published by the Royal Society of Chemistry, including Chemical Communications (until 2012), the Faraday Transactions of the Royal Society, and as Chair of the Editorial Board of Chemistry World. He is the founding Scientific Editor (2002–2006) of the Royal Society of Chemistry journal Organic & Biomolecular Chemistry. In addition, he is an editorial (advisory) board member for the journals Advanced Synthesis and Catalysis, Adv. Phys. Org. Chem., Topics in Stereochemistry, Chemistry: An Asian Journal published by Wiley, and advisory board member for the Journal of Organic Chemistry, Journal of the American Chemical Society published by the American Chemical Society.

On 26 November 2017, Feringa, on a visit to South China Normal University in Guangzhou, was appointed honorary professor of South China Normal University. From December 2017, he holds a "green card" in China, and will lead a team researching “self-healing materials” at Shanghai’s East China University of Science and Technology.

Feringa is a co-founder of the contract research company Selact (now a part of Kiadis), which was originally established to provide services in the area of organic synthesis but later developed high throughput screening methods.
