= Molecular shuttle =

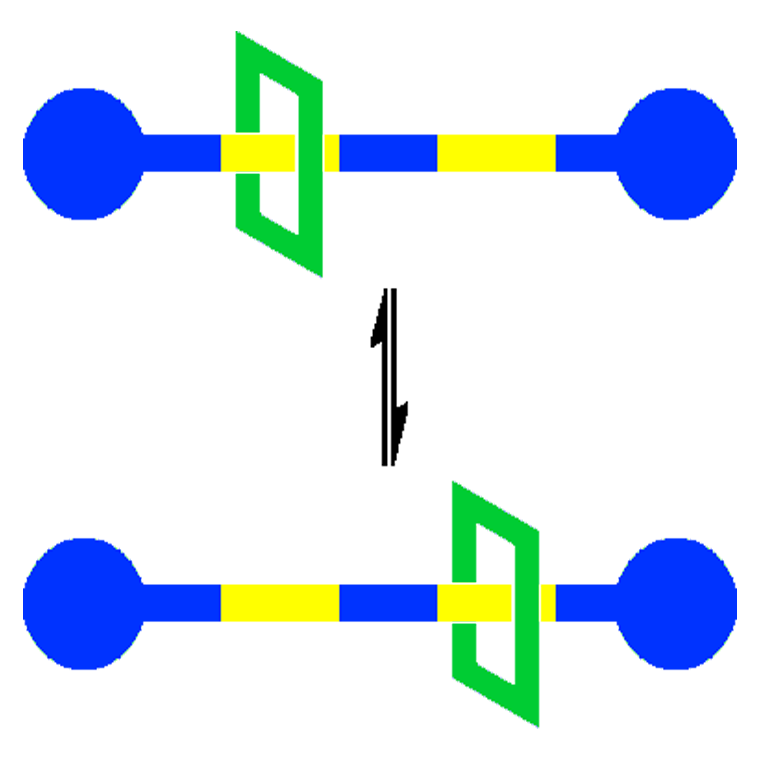
An example of a molecular shuttle where the macrocyle (green) moves between two stations (yellow).

A molecular shuttle in supramolecular chemistry is a special type of molecular machine capable of shuttling molecules or ions from one location to another. This field is of relevance to nanotechnology in its quest for nanoscale electronic components and also to biology where many biochemical functions are based on molecular shuttles. Academic interest also exists for synthetic molecular shuttles, the first prototype reported in 1991 based on a rotaxane.

This device is based on a molecular thread composed of an ethyleneglycol chain interrupted by two arene groups acting as so-called stations. The terminal units (or stoppers) on this wire are bulky triisopropylsilyl groups. The bead is a tetracationic cyclophane based on two bipyridine groups and two para-phenylene groups. The bead is locked to one of the stations by pi-pi interactions but since the activation energy for migration from one station to the other station is only 13 kcal/mol (54 kJ/mol) the bead shuttles between them. The stoppers prevent the bead from slipping from the thread. Chemical synthesis of this device is based on molecular self-assembly from a preformed thread and two bead fragments (32% chemical yield).

molecular shuttle 1991 components	Molecular shuttle
molecular shuttle components	Molecular shuttle

In certain molecular switches the two stations are non-degenerate.
