= Nanocar =

Nanocar with C60 fullerene wheels
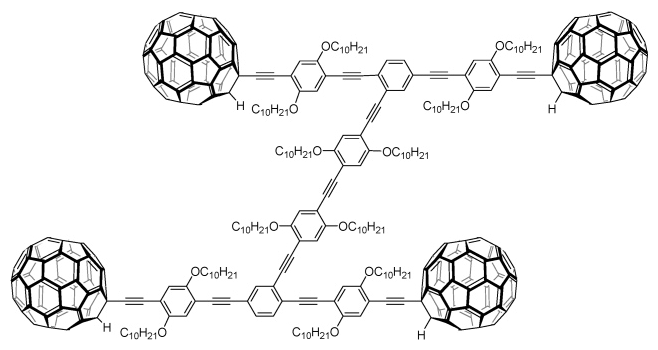
- Chemical structure of a nanocar. The wheels are C_{60} fullerene molecules.

Names
- Preferred IUPAC name 7^{4},16^{5}-Bis[(2,5-bis(decyloxy)-4-{[(C_{60}-I_{h})[5,6]fulleren-1(9H)-yl]ethynyl}phenyl)ethynyl]-4^{2},4^{5},10^{2},10^{5},13^{2},13^{5},19^{2},19^{5}-octakis(decyloxy)-1^{9}H,22^{9}H-1,22(1)-di(C_{60}-I_{h})[5,6]fullerena-4,10,13,19(1,4),7,16(1,2)-hexabenzenadodecaphane-2,5,8,11,14,17,20-heptayne

Identifiers
3D model (JSmol)	Nanocar with alkyl sidechains: Interactive image; Nanocar core structure: Interactive image
ChemSpider	Nanocar with alkyl sidechains: 58142572; Nanocar core structure: 58142573
- InChI: InChI=1S/C430H274O12/c1-13-25-37-49-61-73-85-97-135-431-179-153-173(181(433-137-99-87-75-63-51-39-27-15-3)151-171(179)123-119-165-147-161(111-115-167-149-187(439-143-105-93-81-69-57-45-33-21-9)175(157-183(167)435-139-101-89-77-65-53-41-29-17-5)127-131-427-415-399-375-319-287-255-207-195-191-196-208(207)256-264-248-224(196)232-216-203(191)215-231-223(195)247-263(255)311(319)343-335-279(247)271(231)303-295-239(215)240(216)296-304-272(232)280(248)336-344-312(264)320(288(256)287)376(375)400(415)384(344)392-360(336)352(304)368-328(296)327(295)367-351(303)359(335)391(383(343)399)419(427)407(367)408(368)420(392)427)109-113-163(165)117-121-169-155-189(441-145-107-95-83-71-59-47-35-23-11)177(159-185(169)437-141-103-91-79-67-55-43-31-19-7)129-133-429-417-403-379-323-291-259-211-199-193-200-212(211)260-268-252-228(200)236-220-205(193)219-235-227(199)251-267(259)315(323)347-339-283(251)275(235)307-299-243(219)244(220)300-308-276(236)284(252)340-348-316(268)324(292(260)291)380(379)404(417)388(348)396-364(340)356(308)372-332(300)331(299)371-355(307)363(339)395(387(347)403)423(429)411(371)412(372)424(396)429)125-126-174-154-180(432-136-98-86-74-62-50-38-26-14-2)172(152-182(174)434-138-100-88-76-64-52-40-28-16-4)124-120-166-148-162(112-116-168-150-188(440-144-106-94-82-70-58-46-34-22-10)176(158-184(168)436-140-102-90-78-66-54-42-30-18-6)128-132-428-416-401-377-321-289-257-209-197-192-198-210(209)258-266-250-226(198)234-218-204(192)217-233-225(197)249-265(257)313(321)345-337-281(249)273(233)305-297-241(217)242(218)298-306-274(234)282(250)338-346-314(266)322(290(258)289)378(377)402(416)386(346)394-362(338)354(306)370-330(298)329(297)369-353(305)361(337)393(385(345)401)421(428)409(369)410(370)422(394)428)110-114-164(166)118-122-170-156-190(442-146-108-96-84-72-60-48-36-24-12)178(160-186(170)438-142-104-92-80-68-56-44-32-20-8)130-134-430-418-405-381-325-293-261-213-201-194-202-214(213)262-270-254-230(202)238-222-206(194)221-237-229(201)253-269(261)317(325)349-341-285(253)277(237)309-301-245(221)246(222)302-310-278(238)286(254)342-350-318(270)326(294(262)293)382(381)406(418)390(350)398-366(342)358(310)374-334(302)333(301)373-357(309)365(341)397(389(349)405)425(430)413(373)414(374)426(398)430/h109-110,113-114,147-160,415-418H,13-108,135-146H2,1-12H3/t415-,416-,417-,418-,427+,428+,429+,430+ Key: XMCLKYABXSBFLO-GAVGUPCASA-N; Nanocar core structure: InChI=1S/C310H34/c1(53-3-7-59(8-4-53)33-41-69-51-65(29-27-55-11-19-61(20-12-55)43-47-307-295-279-255-199-167-135-87-75-71-76-88(87)136-144-128-104(76)112-96-83(71)95-111-103(75)127-143(135)191(199)223-215-159(127)151(111)183-175-119(95)120(96)176-184-152(112)160(128)216-224-192(144)200(168(136)167)256(255)280(295)264(224)272-240(216)232(184)248-208(176)207(175)247-231(183)239(215)271(263(223)279)299(307)287(247)288(248)300(272)307)35-39-67(69)37-31-57-15-23-63(24-16-57)45-49-309-297-283-259-203-171-139-91-79-73-80-92(91)140-148-132-108(80)116-100-85(73)99-115-107(79)131-147(139)195(203)227-219-163(131)155(115)187-179-123(99)124(100)180-188-156(116)164(132)220-228-196(148)204(172(140)171)260(259)284(297)268(228)276-244(220)236(188)252-212(180)211(179)251-235(187)243(219)275(267(227)283)303(309)291(251)292(252)304(276)309)2-54-5-9-60(10-6-54)34-42-70-52-66(30-28-56-13-21-62(22-14-56)44-48-308-296-281-257-201-169-137-89-77-72-78-90(89)138-146-130-106(78)114-98-84(72)97-113-105(77)129-145(137)193(201)225-217-161(129)153(113)185-177-121(97)122(98)178-186-154(114)162(130)218-226-194(146)202(170(138)169)258(257)282(296)266(226)274-242(218)234(186)250-210(178)209(177)249-233(185)241(217)273(265(225)281)301(308)289(249)290(250)302(274)308)36-40-68(70)38-32-58-17-25-64(26-18-58)46-50-310-298-285-261-205-173-141-93-81-74-82-94(93)142-150-134-110(82)118-102-86(74)101-117-109(81)133-149(141)197(205)229-221-165(133)157(117)189-181-125(101)126(102)182-190-158(118)166(134)222-230-198(150)206(174(142)173)262(261)286(298)270(230)278-246(222)238(190)254-214(182)213(181)253-237(189)245(221)277(269(229)285)305(310)293(253)294(254)306(278)310/h3-26,35-36,39-40,51-52,295-298H/t295-,296-,297-,298-,307+,308+,309+,310+ Key: WQLDMLHCQIDOPH-BTRKRKDISA-N
- SMILES: Nanocar with alkyl sidechains: CCCCCCCCCCOc1cc(c(cc1C#Cc2cc(ccc2C#Cc3cc(c(cc3OCCCCCCCCCC)C#CC45c6c7c8c9c1c2c3c%10c%11c%12c%13c3c1c1c8c3c6c6c4c4c8c%14c%15c%16c(c%11c%11c%10c%10c2c2c9c7c7c9c2c%10c2c%11c%16c%10c2c9c(c4c%10%14)C57)c2c%12c4c%13c1c3c1c4c(c2%15)c8c16)OCCCCCCCCCC)C#Cc1cc(c(cc1OCCCCCCCCCC)C#CC12c3c4c5c6c7c8c9c%10c%11c%12c%13c9c7c7c5c5c3c3c1c1c9c%14c%15c%16c(c%11c%11c%10c%10c8c8c6c4c4c6c8c%10c8c%11c%16c%10c8c6c(c1c%10%14)C24)c1c%12c2c%13c7c5c4c2c(c1%15)c9c43)OCCCCCCCCCC)OCCCCCCCCCC)C#Cc1cc(c(cc1OCCCCCCCCCC)C#Cc1cc(ccc1C#Cc1cc(c(cc1OCCCCCCCCCC)C#CC12c3c4c5c6c7c8c9c%10c%11c%12c%13c9c7c7c5c5c3c3c1c1c9c%14c%15c%16c(c%11c%11c%10c%10c8c8c6c4c4c6c8c%10c8c%11c%16c%10c8c6c(c1c%10%14)C24)c1c%12c2c%13c7c5c4c2c(c1%15)c9c43)OCCCCCCCCCC)C#Cc1cc(c(cc1OCCCCCCCCCC)C#CC12c3c4c5c6c7c8c9c%10c%11c%12c%13c9c7c7c5c5c3c3c1c1c9c%14c%15c%16c(c%11c%11c%10c%10c8c8c6c4c4c6c8c%10c8c%11c%16c%10c8c6c(c1c%10%14)C24)c1c%12c2c%13c7c5c4c2c(c1%15)c9c43)OCCCCCCCCCC)OCCCCCCCCCC; Nanocar core structure: c1cc(ccc1C#Cc2ccc(cc2)C#Cc3cc(ccc3C#Cc4ccc(cc4)C#CC56c7c8c9c1c2c3c4c%10c%11c%12c%13c4c2c2c9c4c7c7c5c5c9c%14c%15c%16c(c%11c%11c%10c%10c3c3c1c8c1c8c3c%10c3c%11c%16c%10c3c8c(c5c%10%14)C61)c1c%12c3c%13c2c4c2c3c(c1%15)c9c27)C#Cc1ccc(cc1)C#CC12c3c4c5c6c7c8c9c%10c%11c%12c%13c9c7c7c5c5c3c3c1c1c9c%14c%15c%16c(c%11c%11c%10c%10c8c8c6c4c4c6c8c%10c8c%11c%16c%10c8c6c(c1c%10%14)C24)c1c%12c2c%13c7c5c4c2c(c1%15)c9c43)C#Cc1cc(ccc1C#Cc1ccc(cc1)C#CC12c3c4c5c6c7c8c9c%10c%11c%12c%13c9c7c7c5c5c3c3c1c1c9c%14c%15c%16c(c%11c%11c%10c%10c8c8c6c4c4c6c8c%10c8c%11c%16c%10c8c6c(c1c%10%14)C24)c1c%12c2c%13c7c5c4c2c(c1%15)c9c43)C#Cc1ccc(cc1)C#CC12c3c4c5c6c7c8c9c%10c%11c%12c%13c9c7c7c5c5c3c3c1c1c9c%14c%15c%16c(c%11c%11c%10c%10c8c8c6c4c4c6c8c%10c8c%11c%16c%10c8c6c(c1c%10%14)C24)c1c%12c2c%13c7c5c4c2c(c1%15)c9c43

Properties
Chemical formula	C_{430}H_{274}O_{12}
Molar mass	5632.769
- Except where otherwise noted, data are given for materials in their standard state (at 25 °C [77 °F], 100 kPa). Infobox references

The nanocar is a molecule designed in 2005 at Rice University by a group headed by Professor James Tour. Despite the name, the original nanocar does not contain a molecular motor, hence, it is not really a car. Rather, it was designed to answer the question of how fullerenes move about on metal surfaces; specifically, whether they roll or slide (they roll).

The molecule consists of an H-shaped "chassis" with fullerene groups attached at the four corners to act as wheels.

When dispersed on a gold surface, the molecules attach themselves to the surface via their fullerene groups and are detected via scanning tunneling microscopy (STM). One can deduce their orientation, as the frame length is a little shorter than its width.

Upon heating the surface to 200 °C, the molecules move forward and back as they roll on their fullerene "wheels". The nanocar is able to roll about because the fullerene wheel is fitted to the alkyne "axle" through a carbon–carbon single bond. The hydrogen on the neighboring carbon is no great obstacle to free rotation. When the temperature is high enough, the four carbon–carbon bonds rotate, and the car rolls about. Occasionally the direction of movement changes, as the molecule pivots. The rolling action was confirmed by Professor Kevin Kelly, also at Rice, by pulling the molecule with the tip of the STM.

== Independent early conceptual contribution ==
The concept of a nanocar built out of molecular "tinkertoys" was first hypothesized by M. T. Michalewicz at the Fifth Foresight Conference on Molecular Nanotechnology (November 1997). Subsequently, an expanded version was published in Annals of Improbable Research. These publications were supposed to be a not-so-serious contribution to a fundamental debate on the limits of bottom-up Drexlerian nanotechnology and conceptual limits of how far mechanistic analogies advanced by Eric Drexler could be carried out. The important feature of this nanocar concept was that all molecular component tinkertoys were known and synthesized molecules (alas, some very exotic and only recently discovered, e.g. staffanes, and notably – ferric wheel, 1995), in contrast to some Drexlerian diamondoid structures that were only postulated and never synthesized; and the drive system that was embedded in a ferric wheel and driven by inhomogeneous or time-dependent magnetic field of a substrate – an "engine in a wheel" concept.

== Nanodragster ==
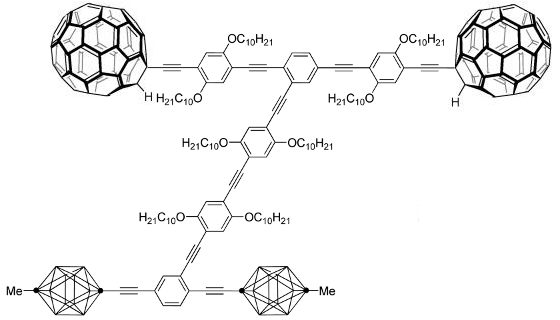
Chemical structure of the nanodragster. The smaller wheels are p-carborane with methyl groups and the larger wheels are C_{60} fullerene.

The Nanodragster, dubbed the world's smallest hot rod, is a molecular nanocar. The design improves on previous nanocar designs and is a step towards creating molecular machines. The name comes from the nanocar's resemblance to a dragster, as its staggered wheel fitment has a shorter axle with smaller wheels in the front and a longer axle with larger wheels in the back.

The nanocar was developed at Rice University's Richard E. Smalley Institute Nanoscale Science and Technology by the team of James Tour, Kevin Kelly and other colleagues involved in its research. The previous nanocar developed was 3 to 4 nanometers which was a little over^{[the width of?]} a strand of DNA and was around 20,000 times thinner than a human hair. These nanocars were built with carbon buckyballs as their four wheels, and the surface on which they were placed required a temperature of 400 °F (200 °C) to get it moving. On the other hand, a nanocar which utilized p-carborane wheels moves as if sliding on ice, rather than rolling. Such observations led to the production of nanocars which had both wheel designs.

The nanodragster is 50,000 times thinner than a human hair and has a top speed of 0.014 millimeters per hour (0.0006 in/h or 3.89×10^{−9} m/s). The rear wheels are spherical fullerene molecules, or buckyballs, composed of sixty carbon atoms each, which are attracted to a dragstrip that is made up of a very fine layer of gold. This design also enabled Tour's team to operate the device at lower temperatures.

The nanodragster and other nano-machines are designed for use in transporting items. The technology can be used in manufacturing computer circuits and electronic components, or in conjunction with pharmaceuticals inside the human body. Tour also speculated that the knowledge gained from the nanocar research would help build efficient catalytic systems in the future.

== Electrically driven directional motion of a four-wheel molecule on a metal surface ==
Kudernac et al. described a specially designed molecule that has four motorized "wheels". By depositing the molecule on a copper surface and providing them with sufficient energy from electrons of a scanning tunnelling microscope they were able to drive some of the molecules in a specific direction, much like a car, being the first single molecule capable to continue moving in the same direction across a surface. Inelastic electron tunnelling induces conformational changes in the rotors and propels the molecule across a copper surface. By changing the direction of the rotary motion of individual motor units, the self-propelling molecular 'four-wheeler' structure can follow random or preferentially linear trajectories. This design provides a starting point for the exploration of more sophisticated molecular mechanical systems, perhaps with complete control over their direction of motion. Electrically driven in the group of Karl-Heinz Ernst at the Swiss Federal Laboratories for Materials Science and Technology (Empa), this nanocar was built under supervision of University of Groningen chemist Bernard L. Feringa, who was awarded the Nobel Prize for Chemistry in 2016 for his pioneering work on nanomotors (together with Jean-Pierre Sauvage and J. Fraser Stoddart), and served as inspiration for the development of the next generation of electrically driven nanocars, some of which were showcased at the Nanocar Race.

== Motor nanocar ==
A future nanocar with a synthetic molecular motor has been developed by Jean-Francois Morin et al. It is fitted with carborane wheels and a light-powered helicene synthetic molecular motor. Although the motor moiety displayed unidirectional rotation in solution, light-driven motion on a surface has yet to be observed. Mobility in water and other liquids can be also realized by a molecular propeller in the future.

== See also ==
- NanoPutian
- Nanocar race
