= Nanocar Race =

Scientific competition

Nanocar Race is an international scientific competition with the aim of testing the performance of getting a large molecule suspended over a solid surface to cover the largest distance with the use of a scanning tunneling microscope.

The first race consisted of overcoming a distance of 100 nanometers and was held for the first time in Toulouse on 28 and 29 April 2017. A second race was held in 2022 with the winners covering multiple hundreds of nanometers.

== History ==
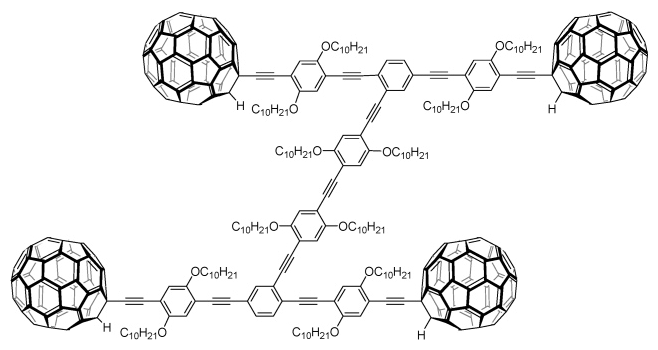
Nanocar proposal by James Tour research team at Rice University (2005). The wheels are fullerenes (C_{60}).

The idea for the race was formulated by scientists Christian Joachim and Gwénaël Rapenne in Toulouse, France in January 2013 in the ACS Nano journal. A call for applications was launched to give the participating teams time to prepare appropriate nanocars. The race is officially announced by the French National Centre for Scientific Research (CNRS) in November 2015 in Toulouse during Futurapolis1. On this occasion, five teams presented their prototype projects on November 27, 2015.

The first race in the world of this type, between four vehicles, started on the 28 April 2017 at the CEMES-CNRS in Toulouse and lasted 36 hours. The Toulouse organizers also agreed on the competition of two more vehicles, which will then be remotely controlled via Internet from the CEMES-CNRS race room on the microscope of their own laboratory. These relates to the vehicles from Ohio and Graz-Rice.

== Competition ==
=== The track ===
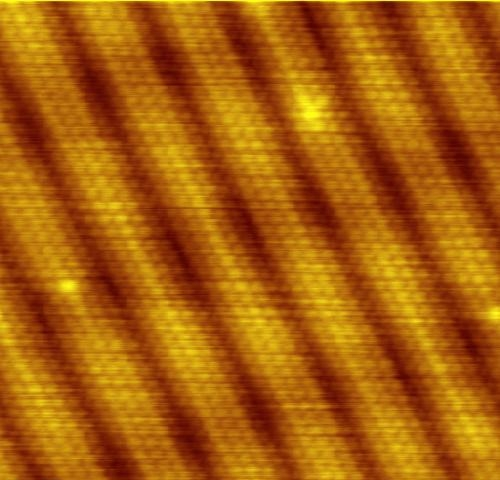
Example of scanning tunneling microscopy of a gold surface. Ridges are used as tracks for the nanocars.

The track of the first competition is a gold surface, equipped with grooves to define race lanes in order to avoid losing vehicles. It is about 100 nanometres long, and includes two bends. It is located in a small enclosure cooled to -269°C under a primary vacuum of 10^{−10} mbar and is observed simultaneously by four scanning tunneling microscopes (STM) miniaturized for this event and operating on the same surface. Each microscope is responsible for driving a single vehicle (a single nanocar).

During this competition, the nanocars should move as far as possible on the gold track during the 36 hours race. Speeds of 5 nanometers per hour were expected.

=== Nanocars ===
Nanocars are a new class of molecular machines that can roll across solid surfaces with structurally defined direction. They are molecules essentially composed of a few tens or hundreds of hydrogen and carbon atoms and are measuring one to three nanometers.

The nanocar is propelled step by step by electrical impulses and electron transfer from the tip of the STM. The resulting tunnel current flows through the nanocar between the tip of the microscope and the common metal track. There is no direct mechanical contact with the tip. The nanocar is therefore neither pushed nor deformed by the tip of the microscope during the race. Some of the electrons that pass through the nanocar release energy as small intramolecular vibrations that activate the nanocar's motor.

For instance, the NANOHISPA team nanocar was designed with an anthracene-based chassis and four aromatic rings that slightly lift it off the Au(111) surface. The molecule is remotely driven in a controlled manner by its attraction to the STM tip, which arises from the electrical dipole induced by electrons flowing through its molecular structure when a voltage is applied.

== Editions ==
=== 2017 Nanocar Race I ===
==== Teams ====
- Switzerland: Swiss Nano Dragster, University of Basel
- France: Toulouse nanomobile club, Paul Sabatier University
- Austria/United States: NanoPrix Team University of Graz / Rice University
- Germany: Nano-windmill Company Technical University of Dresden (TU Dresden)
- Japan: Nano-Vehicle NIMS-MANA National Institute for Materials Science
- United States: Ohio Bobcat Nano-Wagon, Ohio University

==== Results ====
The race on the gold surface was won by the Swiss team that crossed the finish line first after covering a distance of 133 nanometers.

On the silver surface, the vehicle of the Austrian-American team from Rice University and the University of Graz set the first speed record with a peak speed of 95 nanometers per hour, and was ranked equally with the Swiss team which raced on the gold surface, given that motion of the same nanocar on silver surfaces are slower than on gold surfaces. This vehicle was remotely controlled from the Toulouse race hall on the University of Graz microscope. Specific properties of the chemical structure as well as a completely new manipulation technique (without time-consuming imaging steps) rendered this nanocar very fast. These properties even allowed it to complete a distance of more than 1000 nm after completion of the official race track.

The American team from Ohio University turned back for no apparent reason after 20 nanometers, the German team broke 2 vehicles without being able to restart, and the Japanese team ended up giving up. The French team lost sight of its vehicle on its surface area, and was also obliged to abandon, comforting itself with the symbolic prize of "the most elegant car in the competition".

=== 2022 Nanocar Race II ===
==== Teams ====
Sources:

- France–Japan: TOULOUSE–NARA, Toulouse III - Paul Sabatier University. CEMES (CNRS) and Nara Institute of Science and Technology.
- United States–Austria: Rice–Graz nanoprix, Rice University and University of Graz
- Germany: GAZE, Technische Universitat Dresden
- United States: Ohio Bobcat Nanowagon, Ohio University
- France: StrasNanocar, University of Strasbourg and Strasbourg Institute of Material Physics and Chemistry (IPCMS)
- Spain: SAN SEBASTIAN, Donostia International Physics Center and University of Santiago de Compostela
- Japan: NIMS-MANA, National Institute for Materials Science (Tsukuba)
- Spain–Sweden: NANOHISPA, IMDEA Nanoscience Institute (Autonomous University of Madrid) and Linköping University

==== Results ====
NANOHISPA and NIMS-MANA were both ranked first, both making about 54 turns and covering 678 nm and 1054 nm, respectively. The first demonstrated a change of lane for overpassing while the latter crossed a trench and go back. StrasNanocar ranked third covering 476 nm and performing 28 turns.

== Scientific interest ==
Among the benefits, the CNRS cites the development molecular motors and Tech-Atoms, that will make possible in the future the preparation of quantum electronic circuits on the surface of an insulator, atom by atom, whose calculating parts will measure less than 1 nm. To make this kind of race possible, a considerable number of problems had to be solved beforehand, such as the choice of the track and its preparation, the improvement of monitoring and control devices, in particular the sensitivity of current measurements, the evaporation of a large number of very different molecules on the same surface and microscope validation.
