= Molecular propeller =

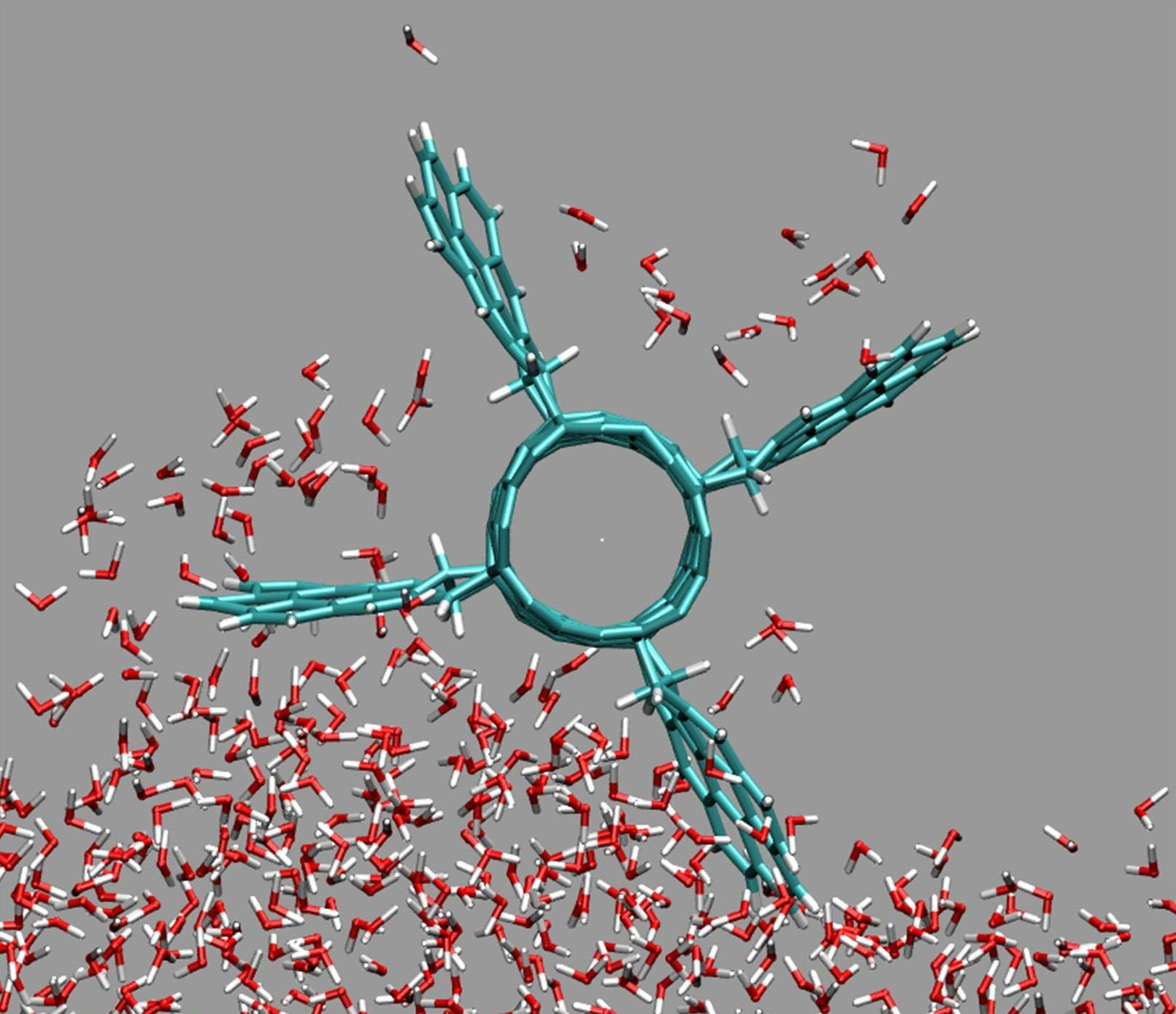
Pumping of water by the hydrophobic surface molecular propeller

A Molecular propeller is a molecule that can propel fluids when rotated, due to its special shape that is designed in analogy to macroscopic propellers: it has several molecular-scale blades attached at a certain pitch angle around the circumference of a shaft, aligned along the rotational axis.

The molecular propellers designed in the group of Prof. Petr Král from the University of Illinois at Chicago have their blades formed by planar aromatic molecules and the shaft is a carbon nanotube. Molecular dynamics simulations show that these propellers can serve as efficient pumps in the bulk and at the surfaces of liquids. Their pumping efficiency depends on the chemistry of the interface between the blades and the liquid. For example, if the blades are hydrophobic, water molecules do not bind to them, and the propellers can pump them well. If the blades are hydrophilic, water molecules form hydrogen bonds with the atoms in the polar blades. This can largely block the flow of other water molecules around the blades and significantly slow down their pumping.

== Driving ==
Molecular propellers can be rotated by molecular motors that can be driven by chemical, biological, optical and electrical means, or various ratchet-like mechanisms. Nature realizes most biological activities with a large number of highly sophisticated molecular motors, such as myosin, kinesin, and ATP synthase. For example, rotary molecular motors attached to protein-based tails called flagella can propel bacteria.

== Applications ==
In a similar way, the assembly of a molecular propeller and a molecular motor can form a nanoscale machine that can pump fluids or perform locomotion. Future applications of these nanosystems range from novel analytical tools in physics and chemistry, drug delivery and gene therapy in biology and medicine, advanced nanofluidic lab-on-a-chip techniques, to tiny robots performing various activities at the nanoscale or microscale.

== See also ==
- Molecular modelling
- Molecular motor
- Nanocar
- Nanotechnology
