= Cropp =

Cropp or CROPP may refer to

- Cropp (surname)
- Cropp River, New Zealand
- Cropp, Virginia, an unincorporated community in the United States
- Coulee Region Organic Produce Pool, former name of Organic Valley, a cooperative of organic farmers based in Wisconsin, United States
- Cropp, a Polish clothing brand

== See also ==
- Crop (disambiguation)
- CROPPS (Center for Research on Programmable Plant Systems), an American research center
