= Crop (disambiguation) =

A crop is a plant grown and harvested for agricultural use.

Crop may also refer to:

- Crop (anatomy), a dilation of the esophagus that stores and softens food
- Crop (implement), a modified whip used in horseback riding or disciplining humans as punishment
- Crop factor, a multiplier factor in digital imaging, compared to 35mm film camera focal length
- Crop (hairstyle), a woman's short hairstyle
- CROP (polling firm), a Canadian polling and market research company
- The Crop (film), a 2004 Australian comedy film
- "The Crop" (short story), a 1947 short story by Flannery O'Connor

CROP may also stand for:

- Council of Regional Organisations in the Pacific
- Church Rural Overseas Program, a former initiative of Church World Service, whose name survives in CWS' CROP Walk fundraising events
- CROP (gene), cisplatin resistance-associated overexpressed protein

== See also ==
- Cropping (disambiguation)
- Cropp (disambiguation)
