= Oesper Award =

Chemistry award

- Date: 1981
- Country: United States of America
- Presented by: University of Cincinnati and the Cincinnati Section of the American Chemical Society

The Ralph and Helen Oesper Award or Oesper Award was first given in 1981 by the University of Cincinnati and the Cincinnati Section of the American Chemical Society. The award recognizes "outstanding chemists for lifetime significant accomplishments in the field of chemistry with long-lasting impact on the chemical sciences". It was established with a bequest from Ralph E. Oesper and his wife, Helen Wilson Oesper.

== Awardees ==
- 2025, Melanie S. Sanford, University of Michigan
- 2021, James M. Tour, Rice University
- 2020, Nicholas A. Peppas, University of Texas at Austin
- 2019, R. Mark Wightman, University of North Carolina at Chapel Hill
- 2018, Devarajan (Dave) Thirumalai, University of Texas at Austin
- 2017, Matthew Platz, Ohio State University,
- 2016, Maurice Brookhart, University of Houston and University of North Carolina
- 2015, Karen L. Wooley, Texas A&M University
- 2014, Isiah M. Warner, Louisiana State University
- 2013, Richard Eisenberg, University of Rochester
- 2012, Gary M. Hieftje, Indiana University
- 2011, Charles P. Casey, University of Wisconsin-Madison
- 2010, Kurt Wüthrich, The Scripps Research Institute, (Nobel, 2002)
- 2009, Susan Lindquist, Massachusetts Institute of Technology
- 2008, Alan G. Marshall, Florida State University
- 2007, James P. Collman, Stanford University
- 2006, Richard N. Zare, Stanford University
- 2005, V. Adrian Parsegian, National Institutes of Health
- 2004, George M. Whitesides, Harvard University
- 2003, Alan G. MacDiarmid, University of Pennsylvania and University of Texas at Dallas (Nobel, 2000)
- 2002, Royce W. Murray, University of North Carolina, Chapel Hill
- 2001, Harry B. Gray, California Institute of Technology
- 2000, Mildred Cohn, University of Pennsylvania
- 1999, George S. Hammond, Bowling Green State University
- 1998, Jerome A. Berson, Yale University
- 1997, Rudolph A. Marcus, California Institute of Technology, (Nobel, 1992)
- 1996, Ralph N. Adams, University of Kansas
- 1995, Gregory R. Choppin, Florida State University
- 1994, Klaus Biemann, Massachusetts Institute of Technology
- 1993, James D. Winefordner, University of Florida
- 1992, Walter H. Stockmayer, Dartmouth College
- 1991, Derek H. R. Barton, Texas A&M University (Nobel, 1969)
- 1990, Herbert C. Brown, Purdue University, (Nobel, 1979)
- 1989, Allen J. Bard, University of Texas at Austin
- 1988, Konrad E. Bloch, Harvard University and Florida State University (Nobel, 1964; Medicine)
- 1987, George C. Pimentel, University of California, Berkeley
- 1986, Henry Taube, Stanford University (Nobel, 1983)
- 1985, Fred McLafferty, Cornell University
- 1984, John A. Pople, Carnegie Mellon University (Nobel, 1998)
- 1983, Fred Basolo, Northwestern University
- 1982, John C. Sheehan, Massachusetts Institute of Technology
- 1981, Melvin Calvin, University of California, Berkeley (Nobel, 1961)

== See also ==
- List of chemistry awards
