= McCouch =

McCouch is a surname. Notable people with the surname include:

- Grayson McCouch (born 1968), American actor
- Susan McCouch (born 1953), American geneticist
