= Abraham Stroock =

American academic and chemical engineer

- Education: Harvard University (PhD, 2002), Pierre and Marie Curie University (MS, 1997), Cornell University (BS, 1995)
- Scientific career
- Fields: Chemical and Biomolecular Engineering
- Workplaces: Cornell University
- Doctoral advisor: George M. Whitesides

Abraham D. Stroock is an American academic and chemical engineer known for his contributions to microfluidics technologies used in cell and molecular biology, tissue engineering, and In vivo measurements. He holds the Gordon L. Dibble '50 Professorship at Smith School of Chemical and Biomolecular Engineering and is an adjunct professor in the School of Integrative Plant Science at Cornell University. He is the principal investigator and director of CROPPS. In 2022, Stroock was elected as a fellow of the American Association for the Advancement of Science.

== Education and career ==
Stroock received his Bachelor of Science degree in Physics from Cornell University in 1995. Following graduation, he worked in the research division of Electricite de France and in 1997 completed a master's degree at the University of Paris VI and XI in Solid State Physics. He returned to the United States to pursue graduate studies at Harvard University, where he earned his Ph.D. in Chemical Physics in 2002 under the supervision of George M. Whitesides.

After completing his Ph.D., Stroock joined the faculty at Cornell University in 2003. He was promoted to associate professor in 2009 and full professor in 2015, when he was named the Gordon L. Dibble '50 Professor of Chemical Engineering. At the Smith School of Chemical and Biomolecular Engineering at Cornell, he has served as school director from 2016-2021.

Stroock has been involved in executive positions at several Cornell initiatives dedicated to driving scientific advancements through the development of tools and infrastructure to explore, characterize and innovate across the nanoscale and agricultural domains. Since 2010 he has served on the executive committees of the Cornell Nanoscale Facility and from 2018-2021 served as associate director for the Cornell Institute for Digital Agriculture.

== Research ==
Stroock's research interests lie at the intersection of engineering and biology. He has made contributions to the field of microfluidics, developing techniques for manipulating fluids on a small scale. His work has applications in various fields, including biomedical research, agriculture and environmental monitoring.

His graduate research at Harvard focused on the development of microfluidic platforms for studying biological systems, particularly focusing on understanding the behavior of cells and tissues in complex environments. At Cornell, Stroock’s research explores how to manipulate transport dynamics and chemical processes at micrometer scales in both natural and synthetic systems. His work is particularly focused on understanding and engineering microvascular processes in mammals and plants.

Stroock leads research that includes studying and applying plant-inspired mechanisms for liquid manipulation, investigating properties of liquid water under negative pressure, exploring biophysical processes governing vascular development for tissue engineering and conducting theoretical, numerical, and experimental studies of fluid mechanics at small scales for chemical processes.

=== Plant Biology ===
Stroock’s work in plant biology has focused on experiments and modeling related to vascular function and drought stress physiology. He contributed seminal research replicating how plants move water from roots to leaves using the cohesion-tension process in an artificial device. In 2014, he published a detailed mathematical model of the coupled thermal and mass transfer processes in leaves and microelectromechanical device for continuous measurements of stem water potential. He has published research on plant physiology and water dynamics, including multi-scale mathematical model into localized measurements of water potential, microfluidic model of symplastic phloem loading and a non-disruptive nanoreporter of local water in leaves. His lab developed a microelectromechanical system (MEMS)-based tensiometer, a microtensiometer that allows for in-plant, continuous measurement of stem water potential. FloraPulse Co. has commercialized this technology for use in a variety of crops and has sales to growers and scientists around the world.

=== AquaDust ===
The Stroock lab developed AquaDust, which uses nanoscale sensors and fiber optics to measure water status inside the leaf of a plant. This material consists of tiny hydrogel particles embedded with fluorescent dyes that respond to water stress and reports the water potential of the air-space near the mesophyll. AquaDust has applications in agricultural settings to monitor soil moisture and optimize irrigation.

=== Center for Research on Programmable Plant Systems ===
Stroock became director and principal investigator of the Center for Research on Programmable Plant Systems (CROPPS) in 2022 after serving as co-PI with Susan McCouch since the inception of CROPPS in 2021. CROPPS is a collaborative research initiative that focuses on the convergence of plant physiology, advanced engineering, computer science and social science to understand and manipulate plant systems at a fundamental level.
