= Mathias Kolle =

Mathias Kolle is a German physicist specializing in bio-inspired optics, optoelectronics and materials science and head of the Laboratory for Biologically Inspired Photonic Engineering at the Massachusetts Institute of Technology (MIT). He currently holds the Rockwell Career Development Professorship and is Associate Professor in the Mechanical Engineering Department (MECHE) at MIT.

== Education ==
Kolle graduated from the Goethe-Gymnasium in Gera in 2000. He then completed his trinational physics studies with a Bachelor of Science and a Master of Science at the Saarland University in Saarbrücken. He also studied at the Henri Poincaré University in Nancy and at the University of Luxembourg in Luxembourg. After completing his studies, Kolle moved to the University of Cambridge in Cambridge in 200 d did his doctorate in 2010 under Ullrich Steiner on the subject of "Photonic structures inspired by nature". As a Humboldt Postdoctoral Research Fellow, Kolle conducted research from 2010 to 2013 at the School of Engineering and Applied Sciences at Harvard University before being appointed Associate Professor at the Massachusetts Institute of Technology in Massachusetts in 2013.

== Teaching ==
At MIT, in addition to seminars, Kolle holds the basic course on measurement and instrumentation.

== Memberships and expert work ==
Since 2016, Kolle is also a consultant for the International Scientific Committee for the Living Light Conference

== Publications ==
Kolle is (as of April 2024) the author or co-author of over 140 scientific articles in international journals. According to the Web of Science, his work has been cited over 5,000 times, resulting in an h-index (according to Google Scholar) of 40.

His most cited publications include the articles "A highly conspicuous mineralized composite photonic architecture in the translucent shell of the blue-rayed limpet" (Nature Communications), "Multifunctionality of Chiton Biomineralized Armor with an Integrated Visual System" (Science), "Bio-inspired band-gap tunable elastic optical multilayer fibers", or "Structural Color in Animals", which he published in collaboration with researchers such as Joanna Aizenberg or Eric Mazur.

His dissertation on “Photonic Structures Inspired by Nature” was published as a book by Springer Verlag.
