= Firat Güder =

Bioengineer, scientist, innovator and educator

Dr. rer. nat. Firat Güder
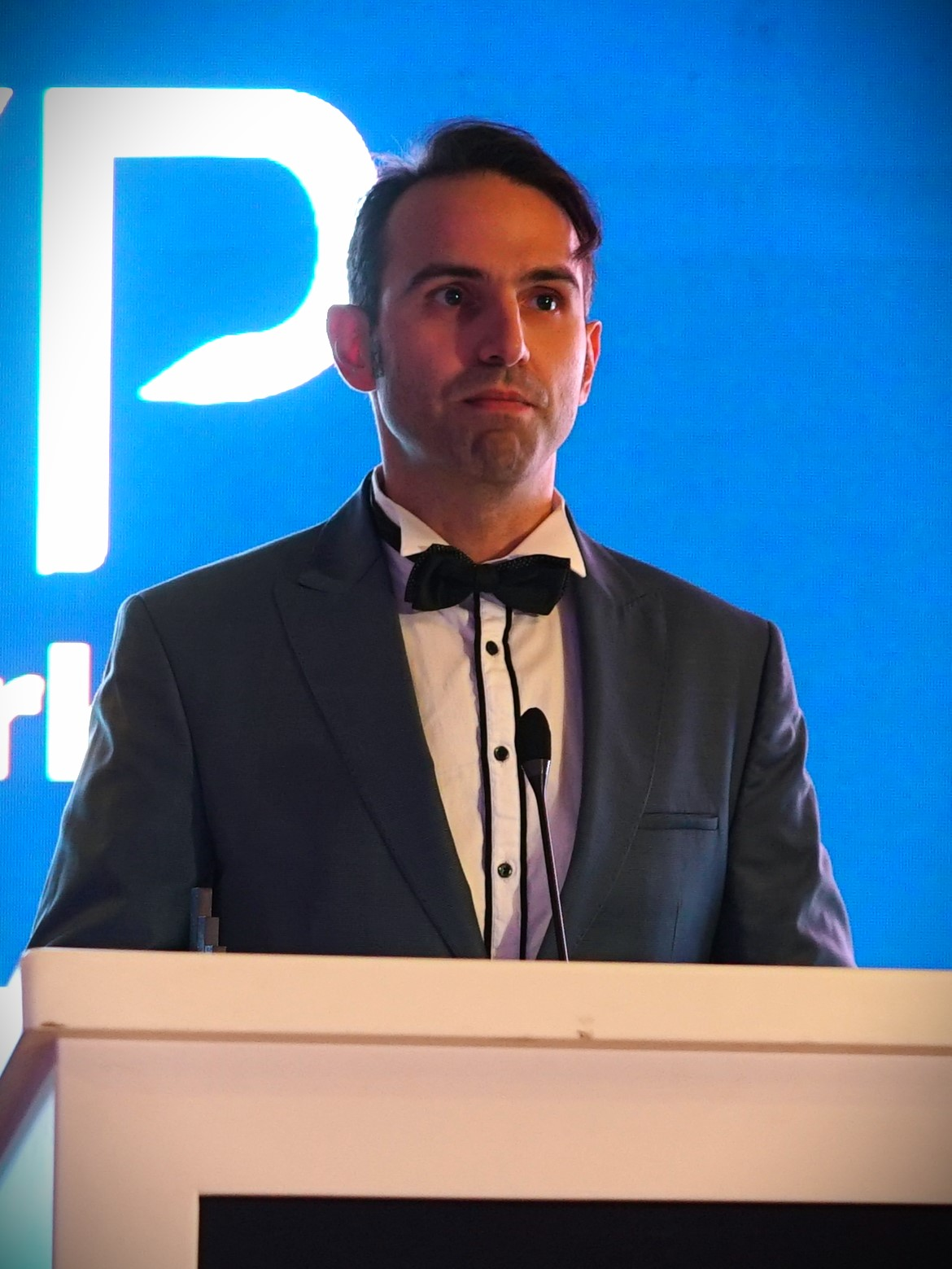
- JCI TOYP Award Ceremony in Istanbul
- Education: Harvard University; University of Freiburg; KU Leuven; Furtwangen University; University of New Brunswick
- Scientific career
- Workplaces: Imperial College London
- Thesis: Atomlagenabscheidung unterstützt Nanostrukturelle Transformationen
- Academic advisors: George M. Whitesides; Margit Zacharias
- Website: www.guderesearch.com

Firat Güder (FRSC) is a bioengineer, scientist, innovator and educator who is a professor of intelligent interfaces at Imperial College London.

Güder is the Chief Engineer and the Principal Investigator of the Güder Research Group which he founded in 2016 in the Department of Bioengineering at Imperial. In 2022, Güder was recognized as one of Ten Outstanding Young Persons of the World by Junior Chamber International for his contributions to science and technology, education, innovation and humanitarian efforts.

He was a Research Fellow at the Department of Chemistry and Chemical Biology at Harvard University. His position at Harvard was funded by the German Research Foundation International Fellowship. At Harvard, he worked with George Whitesides.

== Research ==
Güder and his research group work in the intersection of material science, electronics, computing, biology and chemistry to develop intelligent interfaces to connect complex chemical and biological systems with computers. The overall aim of their research is to develop impactful technologies to address pressing, global challenges related to animal and human health, food systems and environment. Güder is known for his work on low-cost sensors and actuators, wearable and implantable sensors and actuators, software-based chemical sensors, real-time physiological sensors for plants, soft devices, atomic layer deposition, nanomaterials and micro/nanofabrication and the application of artificial intelligence in chemical and biological sensing. His research is supported by the Bill and Melinda Gates Foundation, Wellcome Trust, Royal Society, EPSRC, BBSRC, Horizon Europe, US Army, Innovate UK, EIT Health, and German Research Foundation.

== Startups and entrepreneurship ==
Güder is known for his translational activities having cofounded four deep tech startups to accelerate the delivery of societal impact of his research: BlakBear Ltd, Unhindr Ltd., Spyras Ltd (acquired in 2022) and AniML Ltd. Güder is also a member of the Scientific Advisory Board of Movendo Capital which is a Netherlands-based venture capital firm managing a ~€500m fund to invest in food technologies.

== Education and scientific career ==
Güder started his high school education at the Sanliurfa Anatolian High School before transferring to Rock Lake High School located in Rock Lake North Dakota, USA as an exchange student to finish off his high school education. Güder received his Bachelor of Science degree in Computer Engineering (First Division) from the University of New Brunswick, Canada in 2006. After his undergraduate education, he moved to Europe to study toward an MSc degree in microsystem engineering at the Furtwangen University, Germany and KU Leuven (IMEC) in Belgium. In 2008, Güder joined the research group of Margit Zacharias at IMTEK, Albert-Ludwigs University of Freiburg as PhD candidate and finished his degree in 2012. His PhD thesis titled "Atomlagenabscheidung unterstützt Nanostrukturelle Transformationen/Atomic layer deposition assisted nanostructural transformations" primarily focused on the application of atomic layer deposition to synthesize nanomaterials, study high-temperature solid-solid chemical reactions, Kirkendall Effect and fabrication of nano and micro devices. Güder stayed as a subgroup leader until the end of 2013 before moving to Harvard University as a German Research Foundation International Research Fellow to work with Professor George Whitesides in 2014.

== Recognition and awards ==
- Fellow of the Royal Society of Chemistry
- One of Ten Outstanding Young Persons of the World by Junior Chamber International
- President's Award for Excellence in Innovation and Entrepreneurship
- Winner of the Turkish leg of JCI Ten Outstanding Young Persons of the World in the Scientific Leadership category
- "Rising Star in Sensing" by ACS Sensors
- President's Medal for Excellence in Research for Outstanding Early Career Researcher
- University of New Brunswick Young Alumni Achievement Award
- Analytical Chemistry Trust Fund, Tom West Analytical Fellowship
- German Research Foundation International Fellowship
- KU Leuven International Scholarship
- Furtwangen University MTM Scholarship
- UNB Class of 1939 Scholarship
- N. Myles Brown Scholarship
- Governor Thomas Carleton Scholarship

== Outreach ==
In addition to his scholarly work, Güder and his work is frequently featured in the international mainstream media for public outreach. In 2023, Güder was interviewed by the American innovator Dr. Roman Stolyarov on his hour-long Podcast, Pacemaker where the two discussed Güder's translational work on medical devices, especially wearable robotics. Güder was also featured in several BBC Radio programs in 2019 and 2020 including "Keeping the structure of the internet safe" by BBC Digital Planet, "Global Food Security, Reactive Use-By Labels, Origins of the Potato" by BBC Inside Science and "The Barking Hour" hosted by Jo Good on BBC Radio London. in 2022, Güder was interviewed by Mashable in relation to biometric sensors for dogs which was published in an article online named titled "Biometric dog collars claim to track your dog's vitals. But are they fur real?". His work on low-cost sensors for detecting food spoilage found particularly wide coverage in the mainstream media which included interviews and news pieces by Reuters, The Times, The Naked Scientists and Der Spiegel (German) among others. In 2023, he was also interviewed by the Turkish science journalist Esra Oz which was published in Independent (Turkish).

Güder and his team are also active in communicating their research on YouTube and social media. The science series created by Phil Coatsworth and published on the group's YouTube channel titled "6 questions with..." aims at showing the human side of scientists to the general public to encourage young minds to study science.
