= Jerome A. Berson =

American chemist (1924–2017)

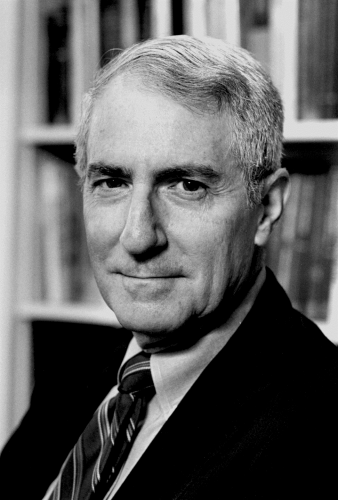
- Born: May 10, 1924; Sanford, Florida
- Died: January 13, 2017 (aged 92)
- Education: City College of New York (B.S., Chemistry, 1944); Columbia University (M.A., 1947; Ph.D., Chemistry, 1949)
- Spouse: Bella Zevitovsky
- Awards: National Research Council Postdoctoral Fellowship, Harvard University (R.B. Woodward) (1949); California Section Award, American Chemical Society (1963); National Academy of Sciences (1970); American Academy of Arts and Sciences (1971); James Flack Norris Award in Physical Organic Chemistry, American Chemical Society(1978); U.S. Senior Scientist Award, Alexander von Humboldt Foundation (1980); William H. Nichols Medal, New York Section, American Chemical Society (1985); Roger Adams Award, American Chemical Society (1987); Arthur C. Cope Award, American Chemical Society (1992); Oesper Award, Cincinnati Section, American Chemical Society (1998); Literature Award of the German Chemical Industry Fund (2000)
- Scientific career
- Fields: Organic chemistry
- Workplaces: University of Southern California; University of Wisconsin; Yale University
- Doctoral students: Theodore Cohen; Peter Chen

Jerome A. Berson (May 10, 1924 – January 13, 2017) was an American chemist who was a Sterling Professor at Yale University, and also a published author. He worked on sigmatropic rearrangements, thermal and carbocationic rearrangements, and the role of orbital symmetry in chemical reactions while at University of Wisconsin. While at Yale University, he was part of many new studies, especially on non-Kekulé molecules.

== Early life and education ==
Jerome Berson was born in Sanford, Florida, to immigrant Jewish parents. His father served as a lay rabbi and his mother was a milliner and housewife. As a result of the Great Depression, his parents struggled to earn a living so they moved to The Bronx, New York in 1934 when Berson was about ten years old and stayed there until 1937. During this time Berson attended Junior High School. In 1937 his family relocated to Long Island, where he attended Long Island High School. Berson graduated high school at the age of 15. He worked riding a Good Humor Ice Cream bicycle for a year so he could save to pay for college. Berson attended City College of New York, primarily chosen for economic reasons, and graduated a semester early with a Bachelor of Science in chemistry in 1944. Later in 1947, he obtained a Master of Arts degree from Columbia University. In 1949, mentored by William von Eggers Doering, Berson earned his Ph.D. in chemistry from Columbia University. He married Bella Zevitovsky, whom he met when they were undergraduates. They had three children, Ruth, David and Jon.

== Career and research ==
After he graduated from City College of New York, Berson began working on penicillin as an assistant chemist at Hoffmann-LaRoche. After brief employment at Hoffmann-LaRoche, he served in the U.S Army Medical Corps during World War II, advancing from private to sergeant. He returned in 1946 and did his dissertation research with William von Eggers Doering at Columbia University. During the academic year of 1949–1950, Berson was a National Research Council Postdoctoral Fellow at Harvard University with Robert Burns Woodward. He served on the faculties of the University of Southern California from 1950 to 1963, the University of Wisconsin from 1963 to 1969, and Yale University from 1969.

During the time he worked at the University of Wisconsin the focus of his laboratory were the thermal and carbocationic rearrangements and the role of orbital symmetry in chemical reactions. Meanwhile, he had taken note of Erich Hückel's, which with Hund's Rule provided continuing themes in his thinking and research.

While working at Yale University, he was part of many new studies, especially on non-Kekulé molecules. He held the title Sterling Professor at Yale University since 1992 and Sterling Professor Emeritus of Chemistry and senior research scientist since 1994. In addition to teaching and research, his activities at Yale University included service as chairman of the department of chemistry (1971-1974) and director of the division of physical sciences and engineering (1983-1990).

He was elected a member of the National Academy of Sciences in 1970 and Fellow of the American Academy of Arts and Sciences in 1971.

Berson died peacefully at his home on January 13, 2017, at the age of 92.

== Honor awards ==
- National Research Council Postdoctoral Fellowship, Harvard University (R.B. Woodward) (1949)
- California Section Award, American Chemical Society (1963)
- National Academy of Sciences (1970)
- American Academy of Arts and Sciences (1971)
- James Flack Norris Award in Physical Organic Chemistry, American Chemical Society(1978)
- U.S. Senior Scientist Award, Alexander von Humboldt Foundation (1980)
- William H. Nichols Medal, New York Section, American Chemical Society (1985)
- Roger Adams Award, American Chemical Society (1987)
- Arthur C. Cope Award, American Chemical Society (1992)
- Oesper Award, Cincinnati Section, American Chemical Society (1998)
- Literature Award of the German Chemical Industry Fund (2000)

== Publications ==
1. William von Eggers Doering and Jerome A. Berson, "A Re-examination of the Diisohomogenol Structure," Journal of the American Chemical Society 72 (1950): 1118-1123.
2. Jerome A. Berson, Chemical creativity: ideas from the work of Woodward, Hückel, Meerwein, and Others, 1st ed. (New York: Wiley-VCH, 1999).
3. Jerome A. Berson and Ronald Swidler, "A Synthesis of Maleimide," Journal of the American Chemical Society 76 (1954): 2835.
4. Jerome A. Berson and Ronald Swidler, "Inert Bicyclic Vicinal Dibromides. Solvolysis, Elimination and Rearrangement Studies," Journal of the American Chemical Society 76 (1954): 4057.
5. Jerome A. Berson and Ronald Swidler, "cis-Addition in the Bromination of Bicyclic Olefins. The Structure and Stereochemistry of the Dibromides of exo-cis-3,6-Endoxo-Δ4- tetrahydrophthalic Anhydride and endo-cis-Endomethylene-Δ4-tetrahydrophthalic Anhydride, Journal of the American Chemical Society 76 (1954): 4060.
6. Jerome A. Berson and Theodore Cohen, "The Action of Acetic Anhydride on 4- Methylpyridine-N-oxide," Journal of the American Chemical Society 77 (1955): 1281.
7. Jerome A. Berson and Theodore Cohen, "Synthetic Approaches to Ipecac Alkaloids. I. A New Synthesis of 2-Pyridones," Journal of the American Chemical Society 78 (1956): 416.
8. Jerome A. Berson, James H. Hammons, Arthur W. McRowe, Robert G. Bergman, Allen Remanick, and Donald Houston, "The Chemistry of Methylnorbornyl Cations. VI. The Stereochemistry of Vicinal Shift. Evidence for the Nonclassical Structure of 3-Methyl-2- norbornyl Cations," Journal of the American Chemical Society 89 (1967):
9. Fundamental theories and their empirical patches Foundations of Chemistry
10. Kinetics, thermodynamics, and the problem of selectivity: the maturation of an idea. Angewandte Chemie International Edition in English
11. A missed turning point for theory in organic chemistry: Molecular orbitals at Montpellier in 1950 Journal of Physical Organic Chemistry.
12. What is a discovery? Carbon skeletal rearrangements as counter-examples to the rule of minimal structural change. Angewandte Chemie International Edition in English
13. Kekulé Escapes, Popper Notwithstanding, (R. Hoffmann, J. M. McBride, and J. S. Siegel made helpful suggestions). Angewandte Chemie International Edition in English.
14. On the origin of long-lived spin isomerism in π-conjugated non-Kekulé molecules Journal of Molecular Structure: Theochem.
15. Lu HSM, Berson JA. Catenation of heterocyclic non-Kekule biradicals to tetraradical prototypes of conductive or magnetic polymers Journal of the American Chemical Society.
16. Bush LC, Maksimovic L, Feng XW, Lu HSM, Jerome A. Berson. Triplet species from dihydroipyrrolo[3,4-d]pyridazines, the diazene precursors of N-arenesulfonyl-3,4-dimethylenepyrroles Journal of the American Chemical Society.
17. Bush LC, Heath RB, Feng XW, Wang PA, Maksimovic L, Song AI, Chung WS, Berinstain AB, Scaiano JC, Berson JA. Tuning the singlet-triplet energy gap in a non-Kekule series by designed structural variation. The singlet states of N-substituted-3,4-dimethylenepyrrole biradicals Journal of the American Chemical Society.
18. Jerome A. Berson. Erich Hückel, pioneer of organic quantum chemistry: Reflections on theory and experiment Angewandte Chemie - International Edition.
19. Jerome A. Berson. A New Class of Non-Kekulé Molecules with Tunable Singlet - Triplet Energy Spacings Accounts of Chemical Research
20. Cordes MHJ, Jerome A. Berson. Medium effects on the rates of stereomutation of a pair of diastereomeric cyclopropanones. Ground state stabilization in nucleophilic solvents induces deviation from solvent polarity controlled behavior Journal of the American Chemical Society.
21. Lu HSM, Jerome A. Berson. 1,3-Bis(3,4-dimethylene-5-methyl-2-thienyl)benzene, a singlet tetraradical prototype of a quasi-alternant nonclassical conducting polymer Journal of the American Chemical Society.
22. Jerome A. Berson. Diradicals: conceptual, inferential, and direct methods for the study of chemical reactions. Science (New York, N.Y.)
23. Borden WT, Iwamura H, Jerome A. Berson. Violations of hand's rule in non-kekulé hydrocarbons: Theoretical prediction and experimental verification Accounts of Chemical Research
24. Cordes MHJ, De Gala S, Jerome A. Berson. Stereochemistry of a cyclopropanone by crystal structure analysis. The exo configuration of the diels-alder adduct of cyclopropenone and 1,3-diphenylisobenzofuran appears to be stabilized relative to the endo by an attractive ether-carbonyl interaction Journal of the American Chemical Society
25. Jerome A. Berson, Jones M. A synthesis of ketones by the thermal isomerization of 3-hydroxy-1,5-hexadienes. The oxy-cope rearrangement [14] Journal of the American Chemical Society.
26. Jerome A. Berson, Hand ES. Thermal rearrangements of the 7-carbomethoxy-Δ2-norcarenes Journal of the American Chemical Society.
27. Jerome A. Berson, Gajewski JJ. Isomeric carbonium ions. Ring expansion of the syn- and anti-2-norbornene-7-carbinyl systems [15] Journal of the American Chemical Society.
28. Jerome A. Berson, Willner D. The ring expansion route to bicyclic carbonium ions. II. The multiple rearrangement of the exo-2-norbornylcarbinyl system Journal of the American Chemical Society.
