= Ralph N. Adams =

American bioanalytical chemist (1924–2002)

Ralph Norman "Buzz" Adams (August 26, 1924 – November 28, 2002) was a distinguished bioanalytical chemist at the University of Kansas. The Adams Institute and Adams Professorship at the university are named after him.

== Background and career ==
Adams was born in Atlantic City, New Jersey in 1924. He was drafted into the Army Air Corps in World War II, flying bombers in the Pacific theater. Upon his return, he studied chemistry at Rutgers University, graduating in 1950, followed by Ph.D. studies at Princeton University under N. Howell Furman. After two years on the faculty at Princeton, Adams became a professor at KU in 1955. Adams' research interests began studying solid electrodes and electrochemical cell reactions. In later years, his research group changed direction and studied how electrical signaling in the brain underlie neurological disorders such as schizophrenia.

== Awards ==
- 1996 – Oesper Award
- 1963 – Guggenheim Fellowship
- 1985 – Reilly Award
- 1982 – Higuchi Award for Basic Science
