= NanoPutian =

NanoKid

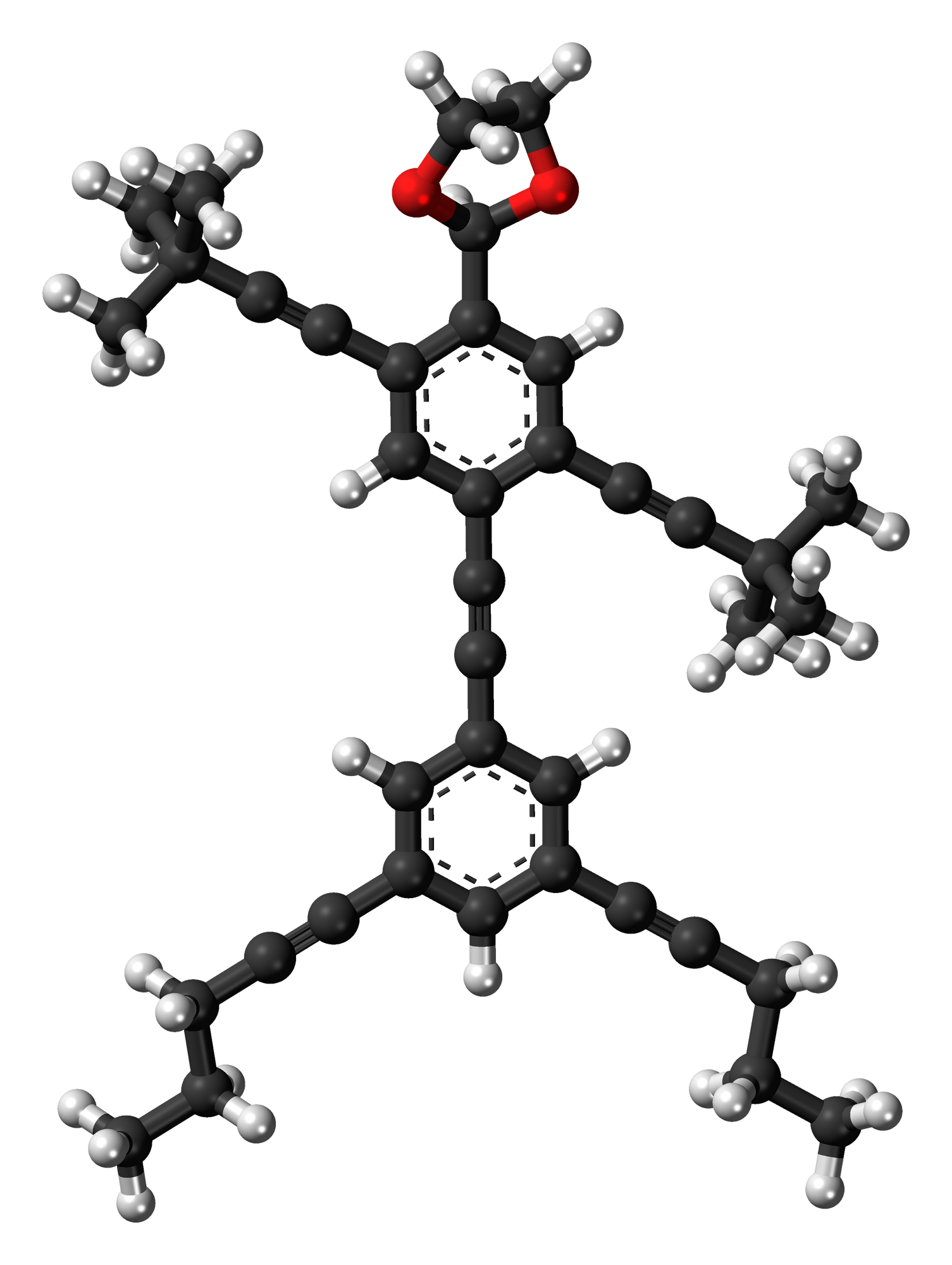

Names
- Preferred IUPAC name 2-(2,5-bis(3,3-dimethylbut-1-yn-1-yl)-4-{[3,5-di(pent-1-yn-1-yl)phenyl]ethynyl}phenyl)-1,3-dioxolane
- Other names: 1,3-dioxolane, 2-[2,5-bis(3,3-dimethyl-1-butyn-1-yl)-4-[2-(3,5-di-1-pentyn-1-ylphenyl)ethynyl]phenyl]; NanoKid; NanoPutian

Identifiers
CAS Number	618904-86-2
3D model (JSmol)	Interactive image
ChemSpider	9528192
PubChem CID	11353257
UNII	Y83XMS9542
- InChI: InChI=1S/C39H42O2/c1-9-11-13-15-30-25-31(16-14-12-10-2)27-32(26-30)17-18-33-28-35(20-22-39(6,7)8)36(37-40-23-24-41-37)29-34(33)19-21-38(3,4)5/h25-29,37H,9-12,23-24H2,1-8H3 Key: LEXBNEYPTZBYBE-UHFFFAOYSA-N
- SMILES: O1CCOC1c1c(C#CC(C)(C)C)cc(c(C#CC(C)(C)C)c1)C#Cc1cc(C#CCCC)cc(C#CCCC)c1

Properties
Chemical formula	C_{39}H_{42}O_{2}
Molar mass	542.763 g·mol^{−1}
- Except where otherwise noted, data are given for materials in their standard state (at 25 °C [77 °F], 100 kPa). verify (what is ?) Infobox references

NanoPutians are a series of organic molecules whose structural formulae resemble human forms. James Tour's research group designed and synthesized these compounds in 2003 as a part of a sequence on chemical education for young students. The compounds consist of two benzene rings connected via a few carbon atoms as the body, four acetylene units each carrying a tert-butyl group at their ends which represents the limbs, and a 1,3-dioxolane ring as the head. Tour and his team at Rice University used the NanoPutians in their NanoKids educational outreach program. The goal of this program was to educate children in the sciences in an effective and enjoyable manner. They have made several videos featuring the NanoPutians as anthropomorphic animated characters.

Construction of the structures depends on Sonogashira coupling and other synthetic techniques. By replacing the 1,3-dioxolane group with an appropriate ring structure, various other types of putians have been synthesized, e.g. NanoAthlete, NanoPilgrim, and NanoGreenBeret. Placing thiol (R-SH) functional groups at the end of the legs enables them to "stand" on a gold surface.

"NanoPutian" is a portmanteau of nanometer, a unit of length commonly used to measure chemical compounds, and lilliputian, a fictional race of humans in the novel Gulliver's Travels by Jonathan Swift.

== Background ==
=== NanoKids Educational Outreach Program ===
While there are no chemical or practical uses for the NanoKid molecule or any of its known derivatives outside of the classroom, James Tour has turned the NanoKid into a lifelike character to educate children in the sciences. The goals of the outreach program, as described on the NanoKids website, are:

- “To significantly increase students’ comprehension of chemistry, physics, biology, and materials science at the molecular level."
- "To provide teachers with conceptual tools to teach nanoscale science and emerging molecular technology."
- "To demonstrate that art and science can combine to facilitate learning for students with diverse learning styles and interests."
- "To generate informed interest in nanotechnology that encourages participation in and funding for research in the field.”

To accomplish these goals, several video clips, CDs, as well as interactive computer programs were created. Tour and his team invested over $250,000 into their project. In order to raise the funds for this endeavor, Tour used unrestricted funds from his professorship and small grants from Rice University, the Welch Foundation, the nanotech firm Zyvex, and Texas A&M University. Tour also received $100,000 in 2002 from the Small Grants for Exploratory Research program, a division of the National Science Foundation.

The main characters in the videos are animated versions of the NanoKid. They star in several videos and explain various scientific concepts, such as the periodic table, DNA, and covalent bonding.

Rice conducted several studies into the effectiveness of using the NanoKids materials. These studies found mostly positive results for the use of the NanoKids in the classroom. A 2004–2005 study in two schools districts in Ohio and Kentucky found that using NanoKids led to a 10–59% increase in understanding of the material presented. Additionally, it was found that 82% of students found that NanoKids made learning science more interesting.

== Synthesis of NanoKid ==
=== Upper body of NanoKid ===
To create the first NanoPutian, dubbed the NanoKid, 1,4-dibromobenzene was iodinated in sulfuric acid. To this product, “arms”, or 3,3-Dimethylbutyne, were then added through Sonogashira coupling. Formylation of this structure was then achieved through using the organolithium reagent n-butyllithium followed by quenching with N,N-dimethylformamide (DMF) to create the aldehyde. 1,2-Ethanediol was added to this structure to protect the aldehyde using p-toluenesulfonic acid as a catalyst. Originally, Chanteau and Tour aimed to couple this structure with alkynes, but this resulted in very low yields of the desired products. To remedy this, the bromide was replaced with iodide through lithium-halogen exchange and quenching by using 1,2-diiodoethane. This created the final structure of the upper body for the NanoKid.

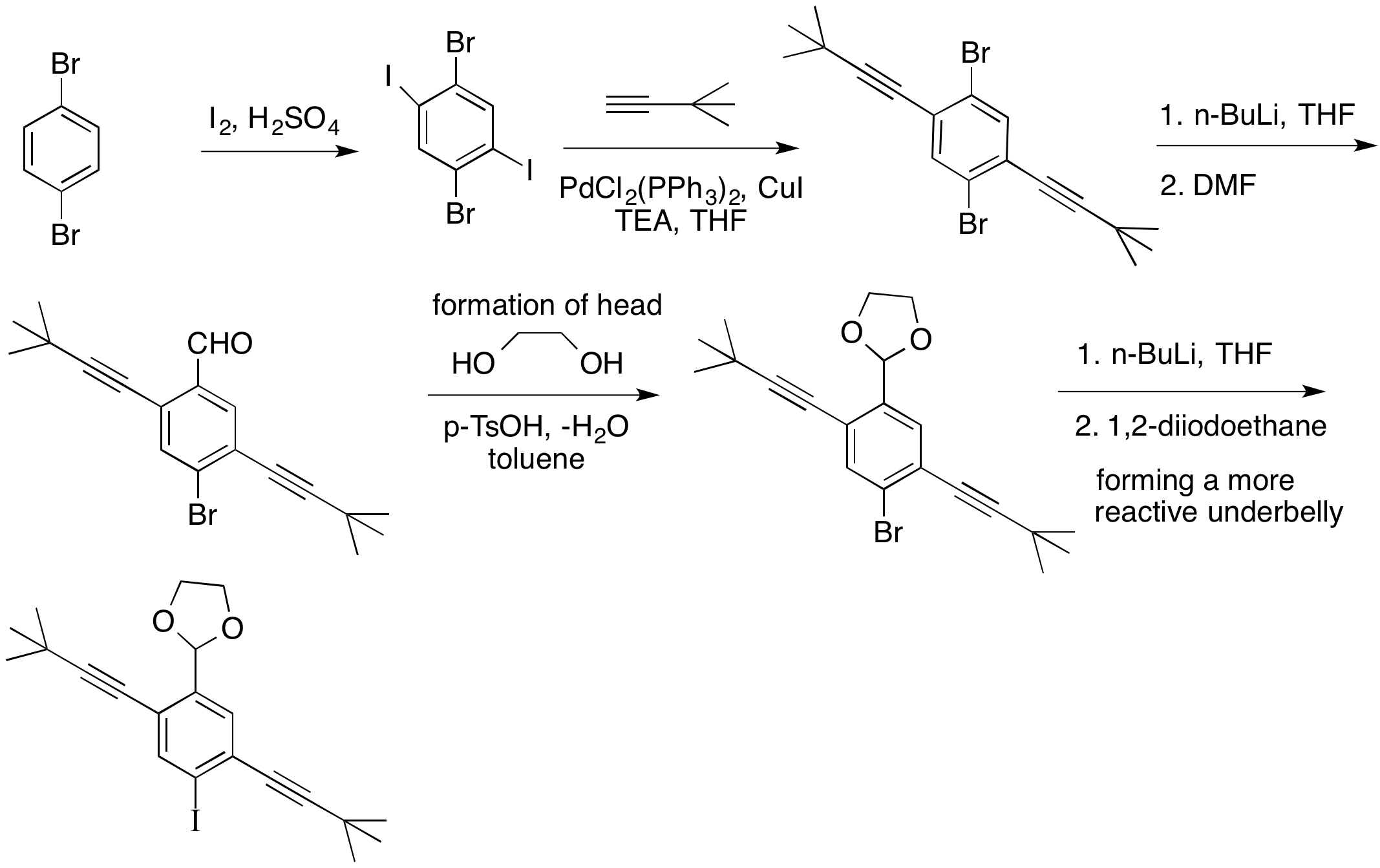

=== Lower body of NanoKid ===
The synthesis of NanoPutian's lower body begins with nitroaniline as a starting material. Addition of Br_{2} in acetic acid places two equivalents of bromine on the benzene ring. NH_{2} is an electron donating group, and NO_{2} is an electron withdrawing group, which both direct bromination to the meta position relative to the NO_{2} substituent. Addition of NaNO_{2}, H_{2}SO_{4}, and EtOH removes the NH_{2} substituent. The Lewis acid SnCl_{2}, a reducing agent in THF/EtOH solvent, replaces NO_{2} with NH_{2}, which is subsequently replaced by iodine upon the addition of NaNO_{2}, H_{2}SO_{4}, and KI to yield 3,5-dibromoiodobenzene. In this step, the Sandmeyer reaction converts the primary amino group (NH_{2}) to a diazonium leaving group (N_{2}), which is subsequently replaced by iodine. Iodine serves as an excellent coupling partner for the attachment of the stomach, which is executed through Sonogashira coupling with trimethylsilylacetylene to yield 3,5-dibromo(trimethylsilylethynyl)benzene. Attachment of the legs replaces the Br substituents with 1-pentyne through another Sonogashira coupling to produce 3,5-(1′-Pentynyl)-1-(trimethylsilylethynyl) benzene. To complete the synthesis of the lower body, the TMS protecting group is removed by selective deprotection through the addition of K_{2}CO_{3}, MeOH, and CH_{2}Cl_{2} to yield 3,5-(1′-Pentynyl)-1-ethynylbenzene.

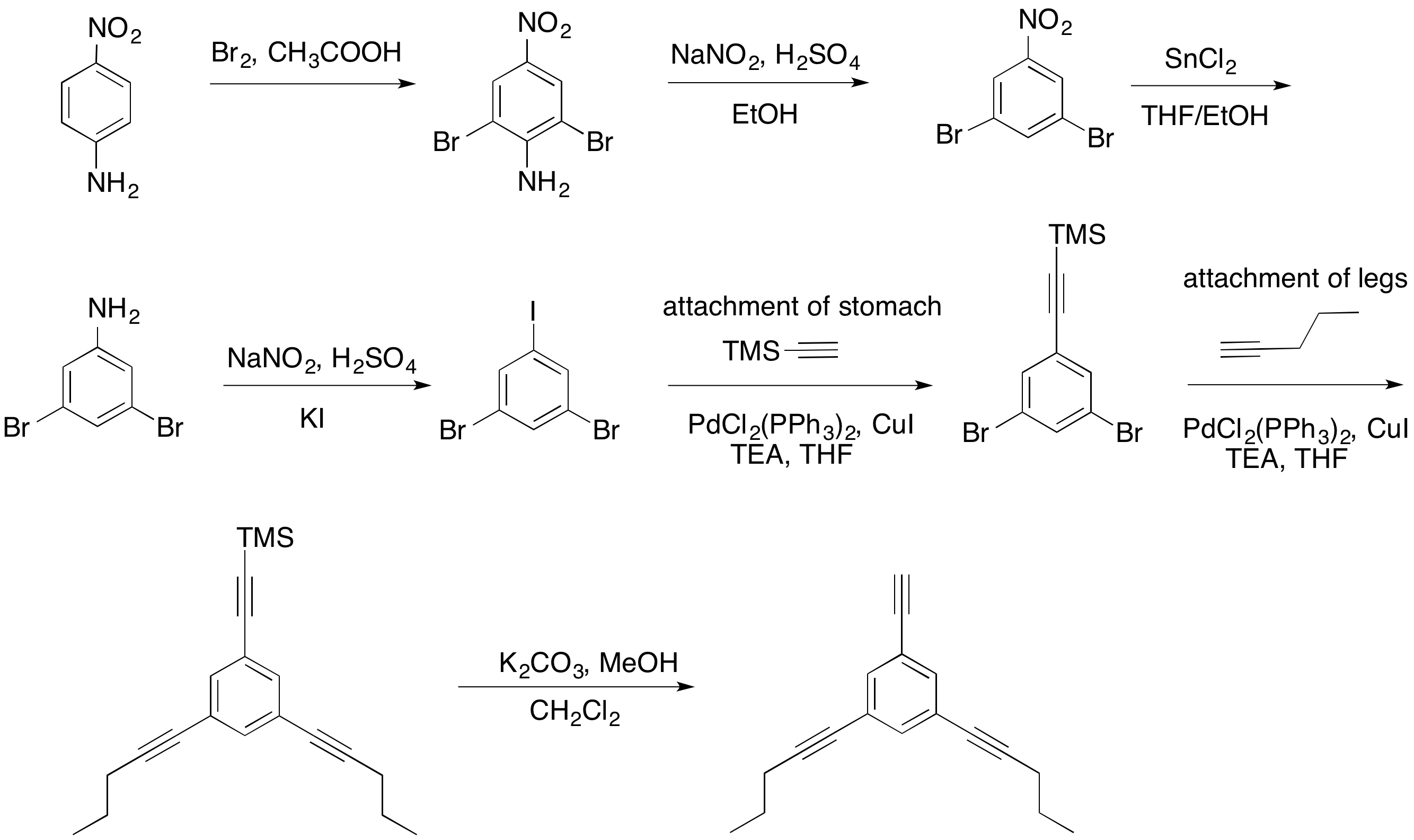

=== Attachment ===
To attach the upper body of the NanoKid to the lower body, the two components were added to a solution of bis(triphenylphosphine)palladium(II) dichloride, copper(I) iodide, TEA, and THF. This resulted in the final structure of the NanoKid.

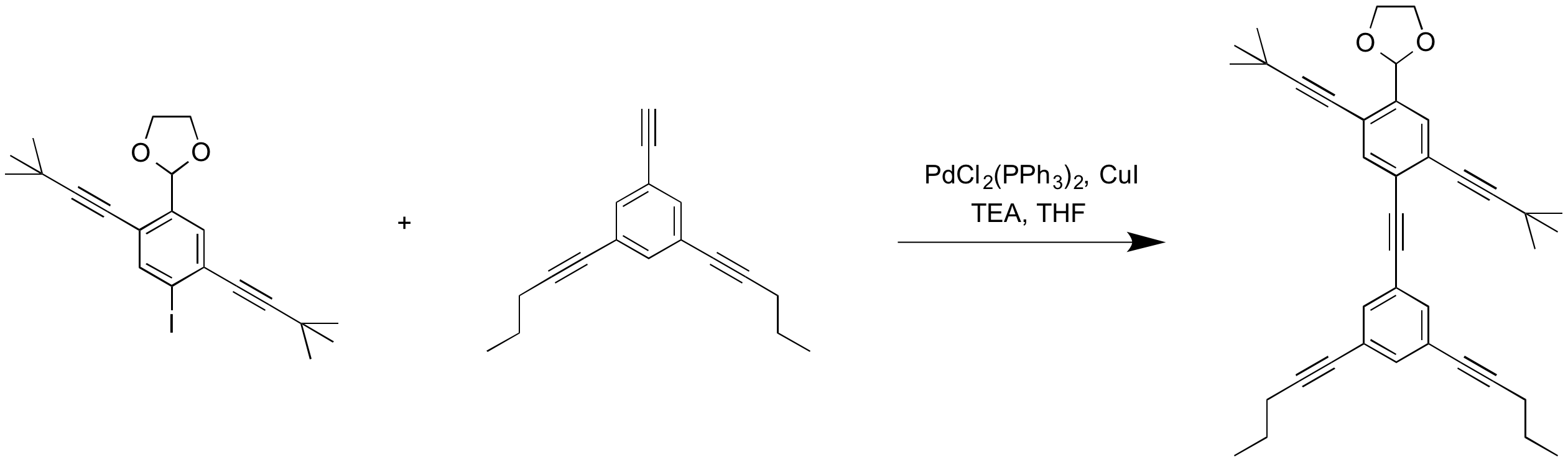

== Derivatives of NanoKid ==
=== Synthesis of NanoProfessionals ===
NanoProfessionals have alternate molecular structures for the top of the head, and possibly include a hat. Most can be synthesized from the NanoKid by an acetal exchange reaction with the desired 1,2- or 1,3- diol, using p-toluenesulfonic acid as catalyst and heated by microwave irradiation for a few minutes. The ultimate set of products was a recognizably diverse population of NanoPutians: NanoAthlete, NanoPilgrim, NanoGreenBeret, NanoJester, NanoMonarch, NanoTexan, NanoScholar, NanoBaker, and NanoChef.

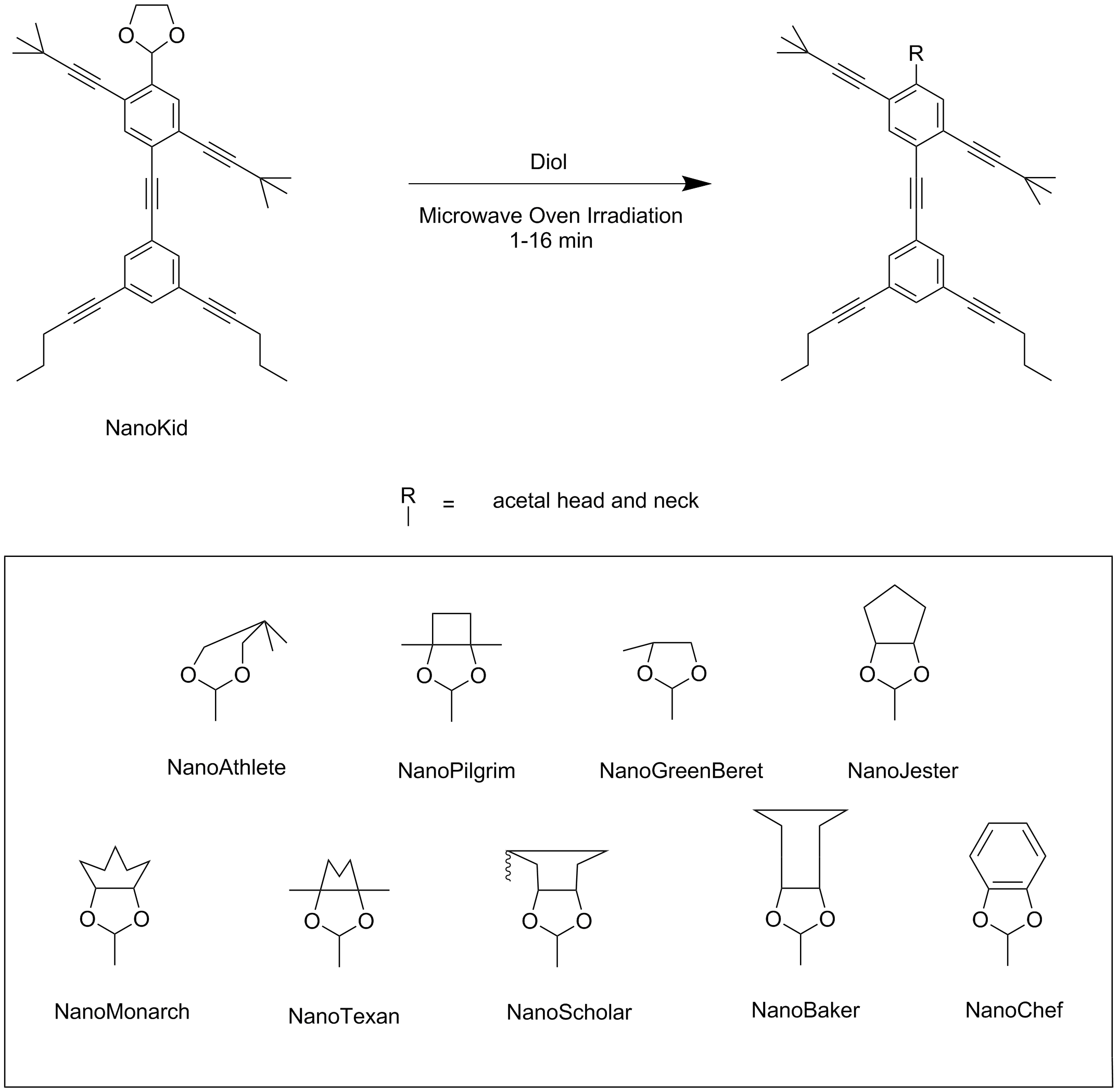

The majority of the figures are easily recognizable in their most stable conformation. A few have as their stable conformation a less recognizable shape, so these are often drawn in the more recognizable but less stable way. Many liberties were taken in the visual depiction of the head dressings of the NanoPutians. Some products are formed as a mixture of diastereomers—the configuration of the "neck" compared to parts of the "hat".

Diol	Equiv. of Diol	Irradiation (min)	NanoPutian	Yield (%)	Diastereomeric ratio
	20	7	NanoAthlete	91	---
	11	13	NanoPilgrim	25	55 : 45
	100	1	NanoGreenBeret	85	1 : 1
	20	7	NanoJester	94	10 : 3
	5	10	NanoMonarch	87	10 : 3
	9	9	NanoTexan	24	3.2 : 1
	20	16	NanoScholar	90	17 : 12 : 12 : 9
	15	10	NanoBaker	84	1.6 : 1
	22	---	NanoChef	9	---

=== Synthesis of the NanoKid in upright form ===
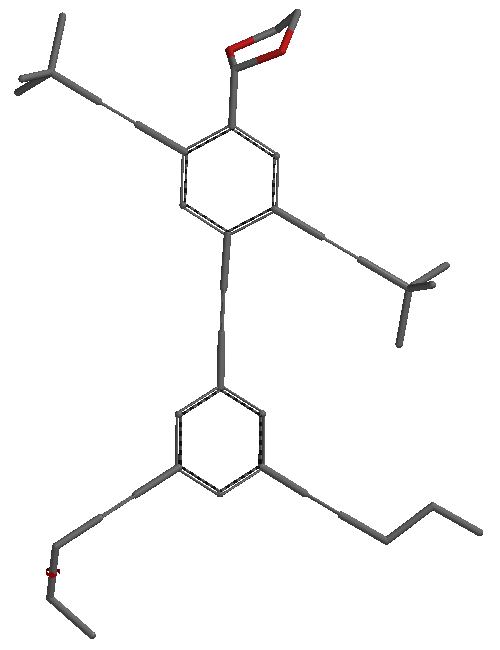
Stick figure NanoPutian in its energy minimized conformation. Determined using Spartan.

3-Butyn-1-ol was reacted with methanesulfonyl chloride and triethanolamine to produce its mesylate. The mesylate was displaced to make thiolacetate. The thiol was coupled with 3,5-dibromo(trimethylsilylethynyl)benzene to create a free alkyne. The resulting product, 3,5-(4’-thiolacetyl-1’-butynyl)-1-(trimethylsilylethynyl)-benzene, had its trimethylsilyl group removed using tetra-n-butylammonium fluoride (TBAF) and AcOH/Ac_{2}O in THF. The free alkyne was then coupled with the upper body product from the earlier synthesis. This resulted in a NanoKid with protected thiol feet.

To make the NanoKid “stand’, the acetyl protecting groups were removed through the use of ammonium hydroxide in THF to create the free thiols. A gold-plated substrate was then dipped into the solution and incubated for four days. Ellipsometry was used to determine the resulting thickness of the compound, and it was determined that the NanoKid was upright on the substrate.

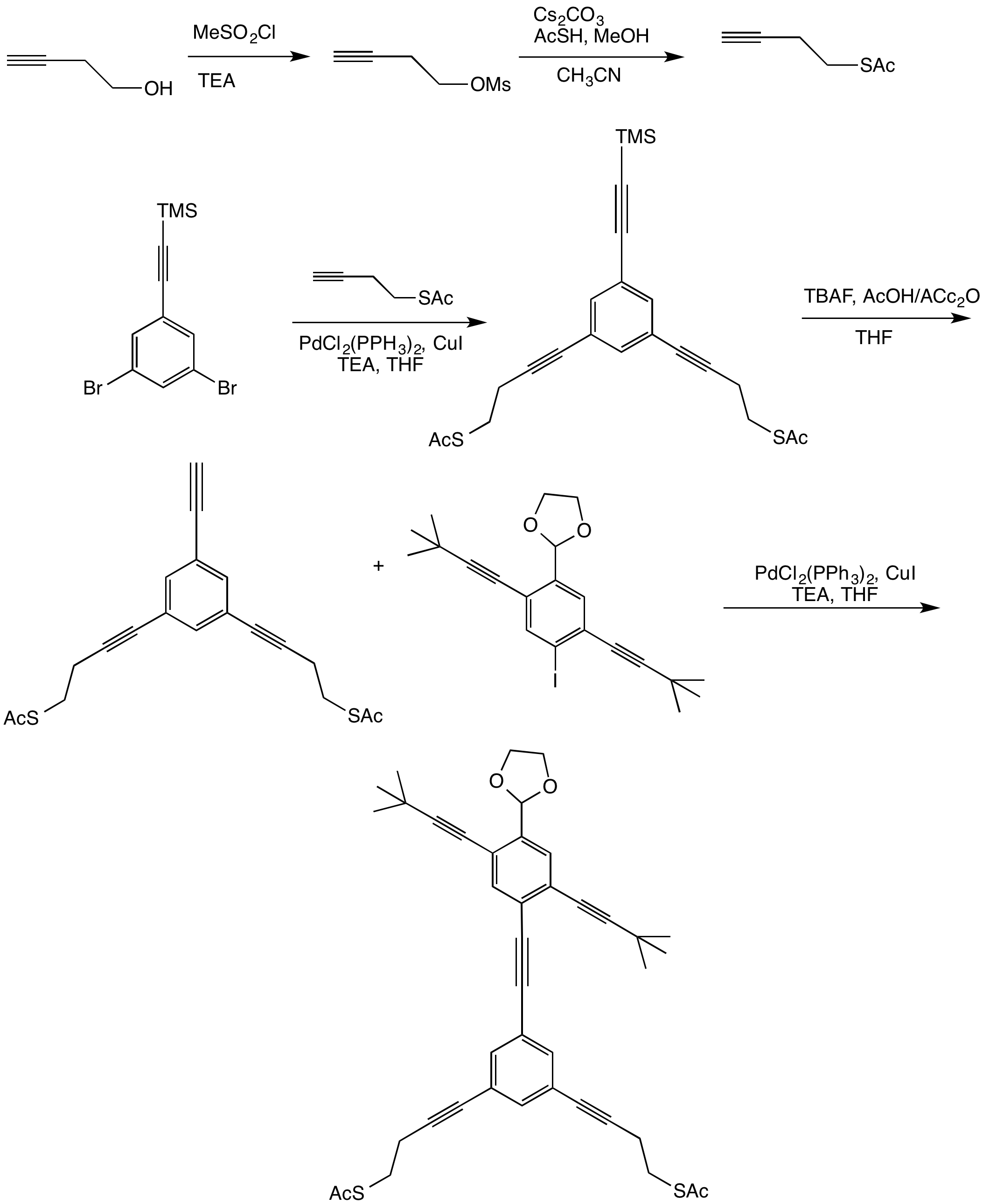

=== Synthesis of NanoPutian chain ===
Synthesis of the upper part of the NanoPutian chain begins with 1,3-dibromo-2,4-diiodobenzene as the starting material. Sonogashira coupling with 4-oxytrimethylsilylbut-1-yne produces 2,5-bis(4-tert-butyldimethylsiloxy-1′-butynyl)-1,4-di-bromobenzene. One of the bromine substituents is converted to an aldehyde through an S_{N}2 reaction with the strong base, n-BuLi, and THF in the aprotic polar solvent, DMF to produce 2,5-bis(4-tert-butyldimethylsiloxy-1′-butynyl)-4-bromobenzaldehyde. Another Sonogashira coupling with 3,5-(1′-Pentynyl)-1-ethynylbenzene attaches the lower body of the NanoPutian. The conversion of the aldehyde group to a diether “head” occurs in two steps. The first step involves addition of ethylene glycol and trimethylsilyl chloride (TMSCl) in CH_{2}Cl_{2} solvent. Addition of TBAF in THF solvent removes the silyl protecting group.

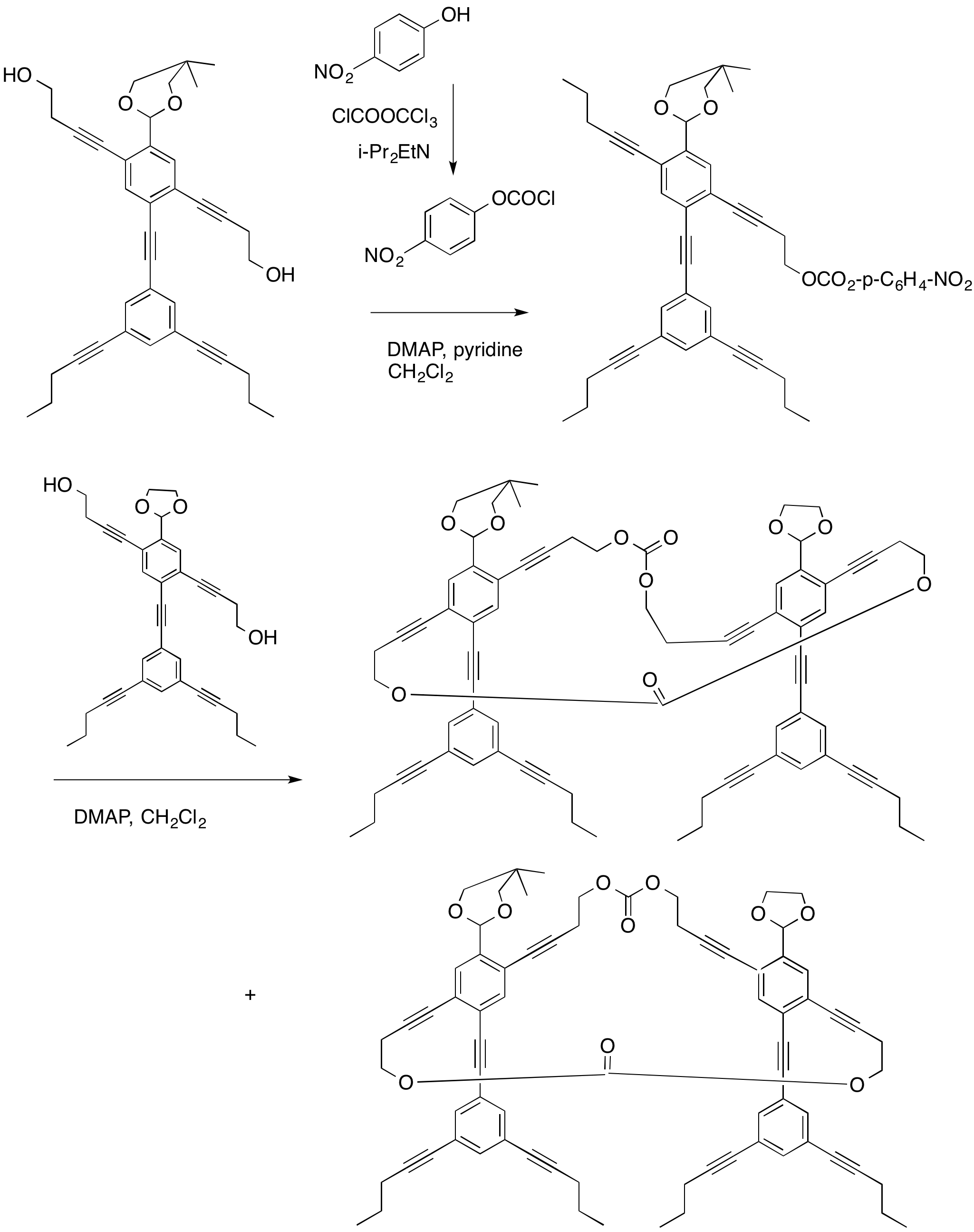
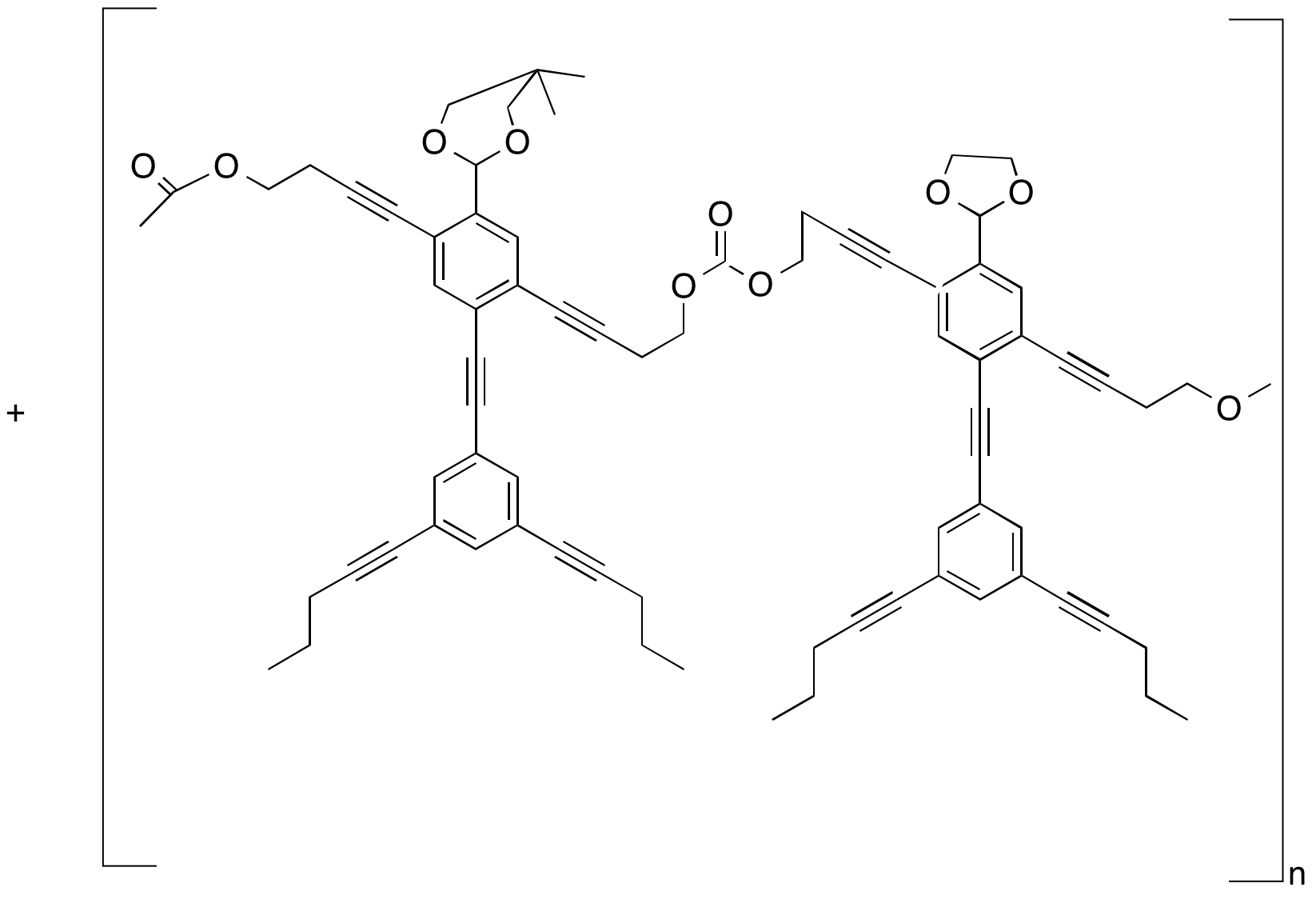

== See also ==
- Nanocar
- Nanotechnology
- Nanostructure
