= Steven D. Tanksley =

American geneticist

Steven Tanksley
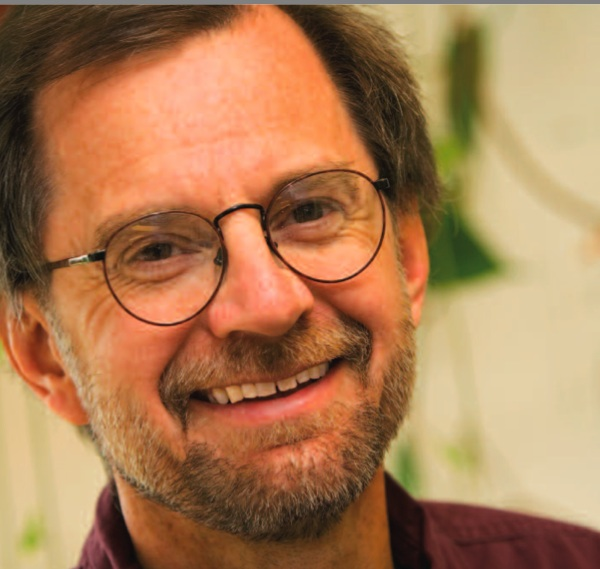
- Tanksley in 2011
- Born: Steven Dale Tanksley; April 7, 1954 (age 72)
- Education: Colorado State University (BA); University of California, Davis (PhD)
- Awards: Member of the National Academy of Sciences (1995); Wolf Prize (2004); Japan Prize (2016); Foreign Member of the Royal Society (2009)
- Scientific career
- Fields: Plant Breeding; Genetics
- Workplaces: Cornell University; College of Agriculture and Life Sciences
- Thesis: Inheritance, developmental expression, and polymorphism of three glycolytic enzymes in species of Lycopersicon (1979)
- Doctoral students: Susan McCouch
- Website: plbrgen.cals.cornell.edu/people/steven-d-tanksley/

Steven Dale Tanksley (born April 7, 1954) is the Chief Technology Officer of Nature Source Improved Plants. Prior to founding Nature Source Improved Plants, Tanksley served as the Liberty Hyde Bailey professor of plant breeding and biometry and chair of the Genomics Initiative Task Force at Cornell University College of Agriculture and Life Sciences. He is currently a Professor Emeritus at Cornell University.

== Education ==
Tanksley received a bachelor's degree in agronomy from Colorado State University in 1976 and a doctorate in genetics from the University of California, Davis in 1979.

== Career and research ==
Tanksley joined the faculty at Cornell in 1985 as an associate professor of plant breeding, and became full professor in 1994. He led the development of the first molecular maps of tomato and rice. In 1993, Tanksley was the head of a Cornell research group that isolated and subsequently cloned a disease-resistance gene in tomato plants. The research is believed to be the first successful DNA map-based cloning in a major crop plant.

Much of Tanksley's work focused on identifying alleles from wild relatives of crops that could be useful in improving cultivated varieties, for example fruit size and shape in tomato, using the technology Marker-assisted selection (MAS). He led work developing the advanced backcross Quantitative Trait Loci (QTL) method, facilitating the introgression of new alleles into cultivated breeding lines. His team also spearheaded using genetic markers in comparative mapping among Solanaceae species and others.

Tanksley has co-authored more than 200 scientific publications and has mentored dozens of graduate students including Susan McCouch.

In 2006, Tanksley co-founded Nature Source Genetics, a company based in Ithaca, NY, conceived to work on creating new computer algorithms to improve the efficiency of using natural genetic diversity in crop improvement. In 2016, Nature Source Genetics merged with the In Vitro division of Agromod, a Mexican company specializing in plant propagation, to form Nature Source Improved Plants, LLC, a US-based company dedicated to the genetic improvement, propagation, and sales of high performing plant materials. The company has one division in Ithaca, NY and one in Tapachula, Mexico.

=== Awards and honors ===
Tanksley was elected a member of the National Academy of Sciences (NAS) in 1995. He has received the Alexander von Humboldt Foundation Award, the Martin Gibbs Medal of the American Society of Plant Biologists, and the Wolf Prize in Agriculture. Tanksley was also awarded the Kumho International Science Award in 2005 for his work in molecular genetics. In 2016, he won the Japan Prize. He was elected a Foreign Member of the Royal Society (ForMemRS) of London in 2009.
