= Tricia Carmichael =

Chemist

- Education: University of Windsor (PhD)
- Scientific career
- Workplaces: University of Windsor; Massachusetts Institute of Technology; Harvard University; Thomas J. Watson Research Center
- Thesis: Studies of terminal phosphinidene complexes of zirconium (1996)

Tricia L. Carmichael (née Breen) is a professor in the Department of Chemistry and Biochemistry at the University of Windsor. She develops new materials for stretchable electronics with a current focus on wearable electronic devices.

== Early life and education ==
Carmichael was an undergraduate student at the University of Windsor, where she earned a bachelor's degree in Chemistry. She remained there for her graduate studies, where she worked on zirconium complexes. After graduating Carmichael was a postdoctoral fellow at the Massachusetts Institute of Technology. In 1997 she joined the laboratory of George M. Whitesides at Harvard University, where she spent two years as a Natural Sciences and Engineering Research Council (NSERC) research fellow. She studied charge transport through self-assembled monolayers, and showed that the injection current density was greater in n-alkanethiolates with odd numbers of carbon atoms. She joined the Thomas J. Watson Research Center in 1999, where she worked in research and development. Here she specialised in synthesis and the development of low-cost patterning methods.

== Research and career ==
In 2005 Carmichael was appointed to the faculty at the University of Windsor, and promoted to Professor of Chemistry and Biochemistry in 2016. Her research involves the development of novel materials and fabrication methods stretchable and wearable electronic devices. A challenge for the real-world implementation of these materials is how they will survive machine washing. She has investigated various means to generate conductive threads, including nick immersion gold plating and soft wax screening. Each thread is bathed in a series of chemical washes and coated with a layer of gold only 100 nm thick, making the process cheap and scalable. In 2020 Carmichael demonstrated a stretchable, conformable light emitting fabric that could be used to replace high-visibility clothing. The semi-transparent fabric contains nylon, spandex and gold, whilst the light-emission occurs from zinc sulfide.

In 2019 Carmichael and her colleague James Gauld coordinated the first LGBTQ+ in STEM conference in Canada.

=== Awards and honours ===
- NSERC Doctoral Prize for her PhD work
- Ontario Ministry of Innovation Early Researcher Award
- NSERC University Faculty Award
- University of Windsor Impact Award

=== Selected publications ===
Her awards and honours include:

- Forming electrical networks in three dimensions by self-assembly (DOI:10.1126/science.289.5482.1170)
- High-performance, solution-processed organic thin film transistors from a novel pentacene precursor (doi:10.1021/ja0266621)
- Design and self-assembly of open, regular, 3D mesostructures (DOI:10.1126/science.284.5416.948)

Carmichael serves on the editorial board of the Institute of Physics journal Flexible and Printed Electronics as editor-in-chief, and Cell Press' Chem. She holds more than two dozen patents for her innovations in materials synthesis and electronic device design. She is also currently scientific co-director of the NSERC Green Electronic Network.
