= Cropp (surname) =

Cropp is the surname of the following people:

- Ben Cropp (born 1936), Australian documentary filmmaker, conservationist and spearfisher
- Dave Cropp (1876–?), American football and baseball coach
- Glynnis Cropp, New Zealand professor of French
- Jack Cropp (1927–2016), New Zealand yachtsman
- Linda W. Cropp (born 1947), American politician
- Martin Cropp (born 1943), classical scholar
- Wolf-Ulrich Cropp (born 1941), German writer and businessman
