= James Tour =

American advocate of intelligent design and chemist

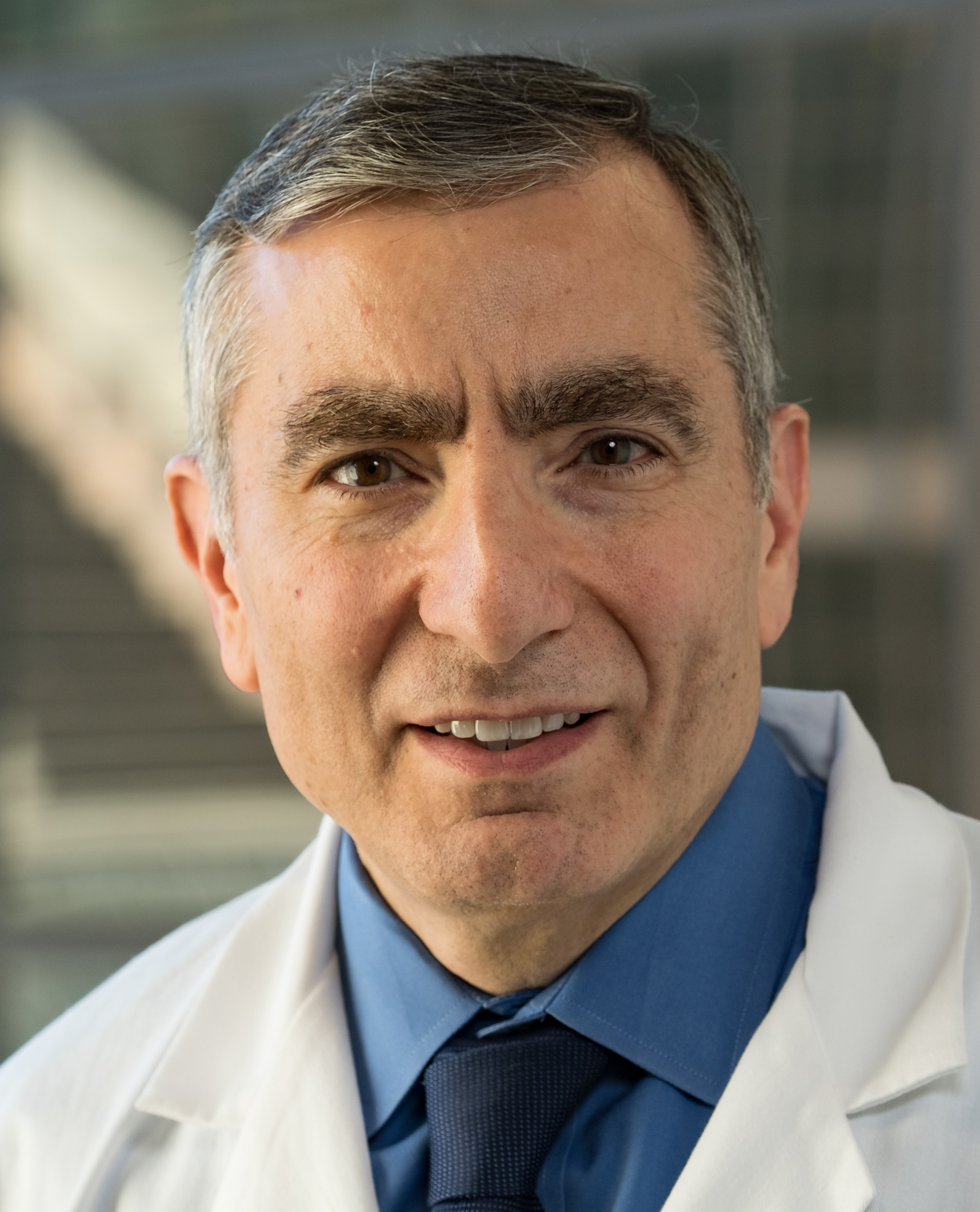
- Tour in 2018
- Born: James Mitchell Tour; New York City, U.S.
- Education: Syracuse University (BS); Purdue University (PhD)
- Known for: Advocate of intelligent design Graphene production techniques Carbon nanotube chemistry Nanocar; NanoPutian
- Awards: Oesper Award (2021); Centenary Prize (2020); Trotter Prize (2014); Feynman Prize in Nanotechnology (2008)
- Scientific career
- Fields: Organic Chemistry; Materials Science; Nanotechnology
- Workplaces: Rice University, 1999–present University of South Carolina, 1988–1999
- Thesis: Metal-Promoted Cyclization and Transition-Metal-Promoted Carbonylative Cyclization Reactions (1986)
- Doctoral advisor: Ei-ichi Negishi
- Website: jmtour.com

James Mitchell Tour is an American chemist and nanotechnologist. He is T. T. and W. F. Chao Professor of Chemistry at Rice University, and a joint professor of materials science and nanoengineering. He is a proponent and advocate of intelligent design, a pseudoscientific creationist argument for the existence of God, and is a skeptic of origin of life research.

== Education ==
Tour graduated from Syracuse University with a Bachelor of Science in chemistry in 1981. He then earned his Ph.D. in synthetic chemistry and organometallic chemistry from Purdue University in 1986 under Nobel laureate Ei-ichi Negishi. After receiving his doctorate, he completed postdoctoral research at the University of Wisconsin–Madison (1986–1987) and Stanford University (1987–1988).

== Career ==
Tour and colleagues worked on materials science, specifically on the use of graphene as a scaffolding gel, as reported by The New Yorker.

Tour has also been involved in scientific outreach, such as NanoKids, an interactive learning DVD to teach children fundamentals of chemistry and physics. He has testified before the US Congress on two occasions to warn about budget cuts.

In the Scientific American article "Better Killing Through Chemistry", which appeared a few months after the September 11 attacks, Tour highlighted the ease of obtaining chemical weapon precursors in the United States.

In 2002, he was the head of the molecular electronics group at the Center for Nanoscale Science and Technology at Rice University.

== Religion and evolution ==
Tour became a born-again Christian as an undergraduate, and in 2001 he signed the Discovery Institute's A Scientific Dissent from Darwinism statement that relies on pseudoscientific reasoning to offer various religiously motivated arguments against evolution. In a 2014 profile in The New Yorker, Tour was reported to have indicated that this signing "reflected only his personal doubts about how random mutation occurs at the molecular level. Although he ends e-mails with 'God bless', he says that, apart from a habit of praying for divine guidance, he feels that religion plays no part in his scientific work." Tour has subsequently become more outspoken about his scepticism regarding origin of life research, including in a debate with science YouTuber Dave Farina at a May 2023 event at Rice University.

Tour is a member of Discovery Institute, and has worked with Stephen C. Meyer to promote intelligent design.

== Honors and awards ==
- Fellow of the American Association for the Advancement of Science (2009)
- ACS Nano Lectureship Award by the American Chemical Society (2012)
- Centenary Prize by the Royal Society of Chemistry (2020), "For innovations in materials chemistry, with applications in medicine and nanotechnology."
- Oesper Award (2021)
- Member of the National Academy of Engineering (2024), "For synthesis, fabrication, properties, applications, and commercialization of novel forms of carbon and their composites and derivatives."

== See also ==
- Stephen C. Meyer
- Discovery Institute
