= Theodore Cohen (chemist) =

Pittsburgh professor

- Born: May 11, 1929; Boston, Massachusetts, US
- Died: December 13, 2017 (aged 88); Pittsburgh, Pennsylvania, US
- Education: Tufts University (B.S.); University of Southern California (Ph.D.)
- Spouse: Pearl Silverman
- Children: 2
- Scientific career
- Fields: Organic chemistry
- Institutions: University of Glasgow; University of Pittsburgh
- Doctoral advisor: Jerome A. Berson

Theodore Cohen (May 11, 1929 – December 13, 2017) was an American organic chemist and chemistry professor at University of Pittsburgh. He is known for his research on organic chemistry, and particularly on organosulfur compounds, on organometallic chemistry, and on the synthesis of phenols.

== Education and career ==
Cohen was born in Boston, the son of a furrier from England, and was the first in his family with a college education. He graduated from Tufts University in 1951 with a degree in chemistry. He was guided towards science instead of medicine in a chance encounter with Isaac Asimov while working a summer job as a waiter, and completed his Ph.D. in chemistry at the University of Southern California in 1955, helping to support his graduate studies by working as an extra in the movies of Katharine Hepburn and Spencer Tracy. His doctoral research, supervised by Jerome A. Berson, concerned the synthesis of alkaloids found in ipecac, and the chemical properties of pyridines.

After postdoctoral research as a Fulbright scholar at the University of Glasgow, working with Derek Barton, he joined the University of Pittsburgh chemistry faculty in 1956, and became one of the first professors at the university to bring in federal grant money for his research. He retired as a professor emeritus in 1999, but continued to do research in his laboratory, often working 80-hour weeks.

At the University of Pittsburgh, he was the doctoral advisor to over 40 students.

== Recognition ==
He was the 2009 winner of the Pittsburgh Award of the Pittsburgh section of the American Chemical Society.

== Personal life ==
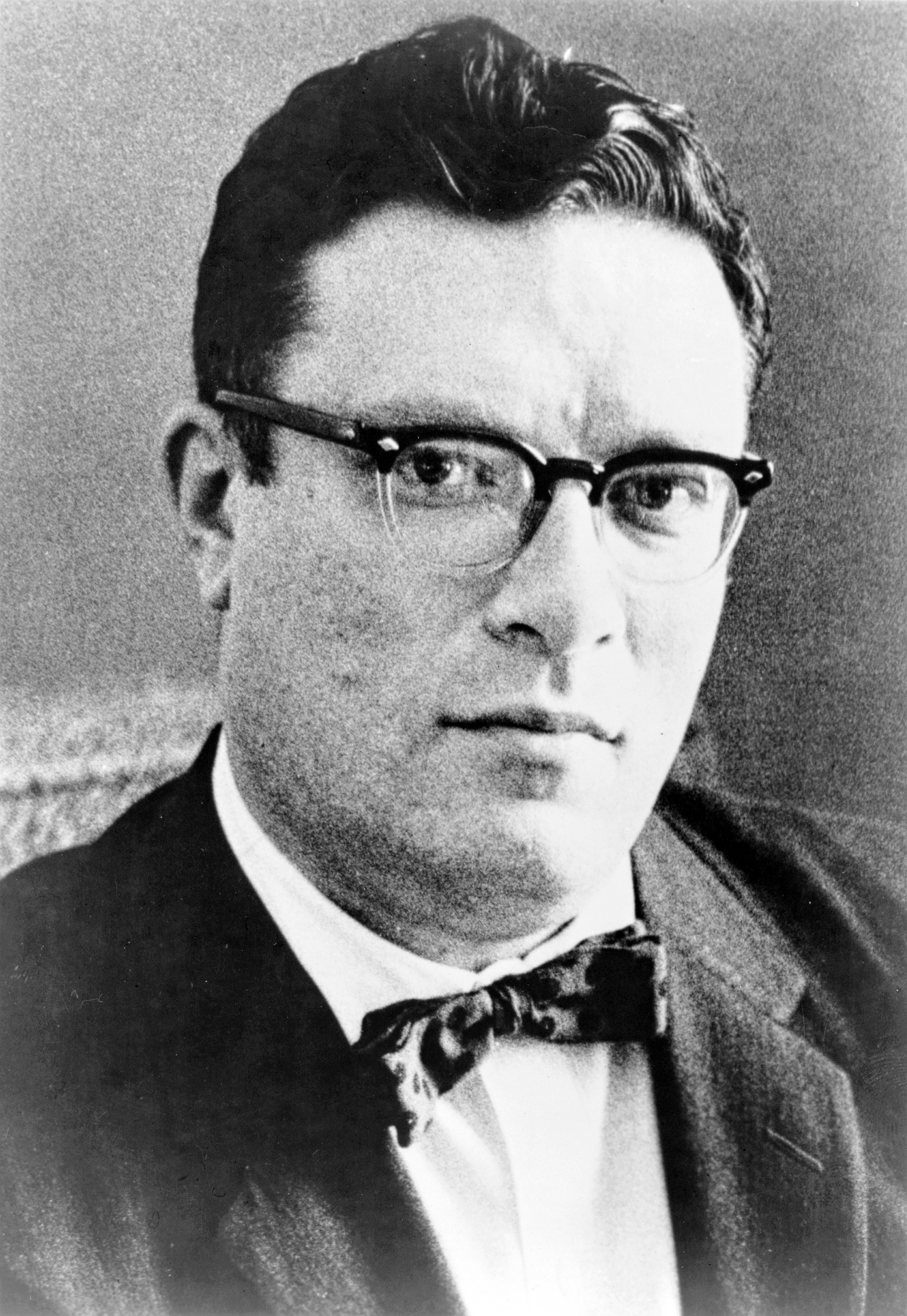
Isaac Asimov in the 1950s, when he befriended Cohen while on vacation

Cohen worked at a holiday camp in Massachusetts while he was a student at Tufts. While waiting tables, he courted Pearl Silverman, a bookish woman from New York. The biochemist and author, Isaac Asimov, also vacationed there and became friends with Cohen. Observing the romance, Asimov wrote songs about it for the camp show, "Poor Ted's in bed. He's lonely but well read"; the couple were later married and went on to have two children, Bret and Rima.

He died of chronic lymphocytic leukemia at a hospice in the Squirrel Hill neighborhood of Pittsburgh on December 13, 2017.
