= Joanna Aizenberg =

American chemist

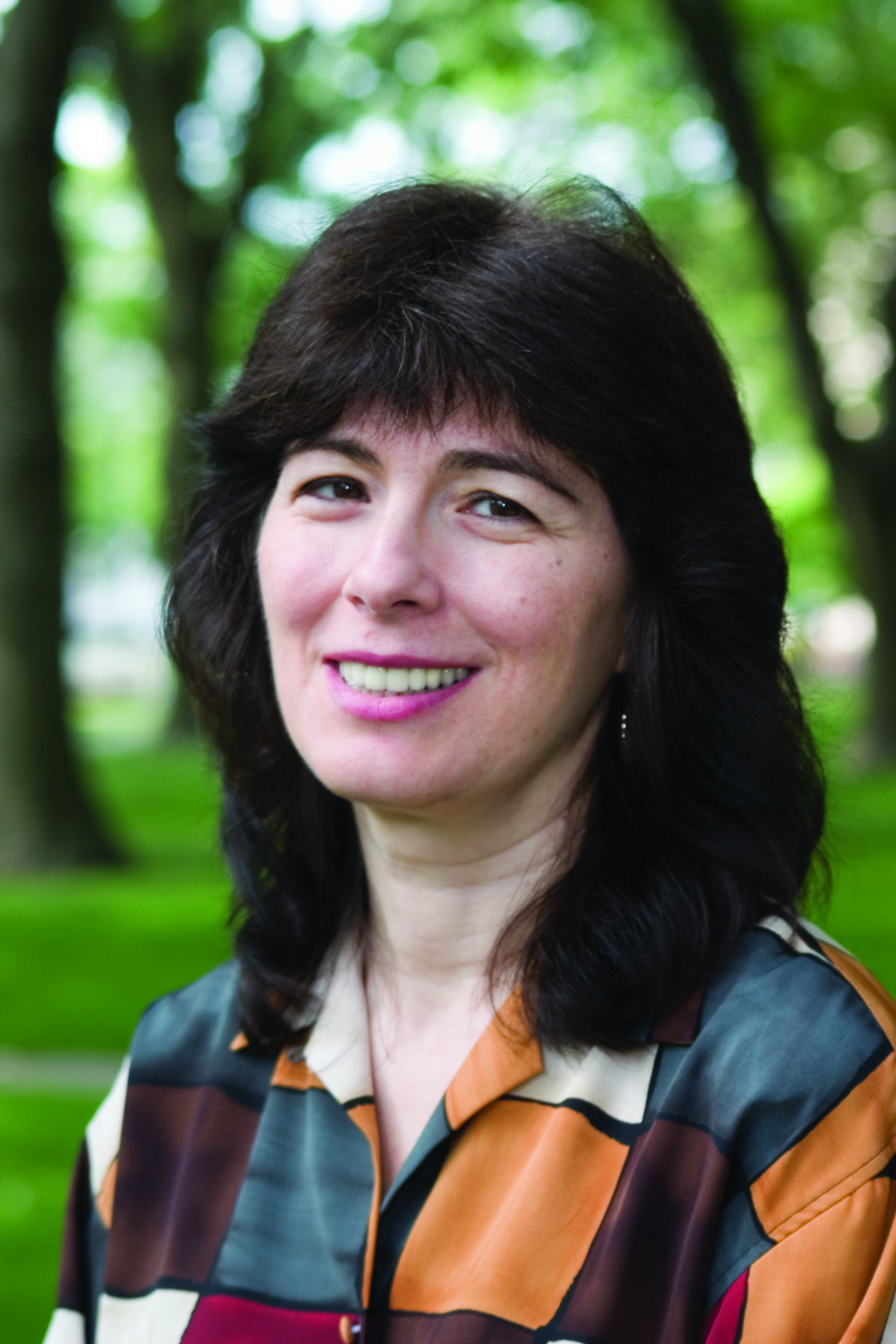
- Education: Moscow State University, Weizmann Institute of Science
- Awards: American Academy of Arts and Sciences, 2014
- Scientific career
- Fields: Chemical Biology
- Institutions: Harvard University
- Academic advisors: George Whitesides

Joanna Aizenberg (born 1960) is a professor of chemistry and chemical biology at Harvard University. She is the Amy Smith Berylson Professor of Materials Science at Harvard's School of Engineering and Applied Sciences, the co-director of the Kavli Institute for Bionano Science and Technology and a core faculty member of the Wyss Institute for Biologically Inspired Engineering. She is a prominent figure in the field of biologically inspired materials science, having authored ~240 publications and holding ~70 patents.

== Education ==
Joanna Aizenberg discusses creating every desired material

Aizenberg received her B.S. degree in chemistry and her M.S. degree in physical chemistry from Moscow State University in 1981 and 1984 respectively, and her Ph.D. degree in structural biology from the Weizmann Institute of Science in 1996.

== Career ==
She did her postdoctoral research with George Whitesides at Harvard University, investigating micro/nanofabrication and near-field optics. In 1998, she joined Bell Labs as a member of the technical staff where she has made a number of pioneering contributions, including developing new biomimetic approaches for the synthesis of ordered mineral films with highly controlled shapes and orientations, and discovering unique biological optical systems that outperform technological analogs, as well as characterizing the associated organic molecules.

In 2007, Aizenberg joined the Harvard School of Engineering and Applied Sciences.

The lab's research investigates a wide range of topics that include biomimetics, self-assembly, adaptive materials, crystal engineering, surface wettability, nanofabrication, biooptics, biomaterials, and biomechanics.

In 2019, Aizenberg was elected into the National Academy of Engineering for contributions to the understanding of biological systems and bioinspired materials design.

== Awards ==
- Elected to the National Academy of Engineering, 2019
- Elected to the National Academy of Sciences, 2019
- Elected to the American Philosophical Society (2016)
- Elected to the American Academy of Arts and Sciences (2014)
- Ronald Breslow Award for the Achievement in Biomimetic Chemistry, ACS 2008
- Industrial Innovation Award, American Chemical Society, 2007
- Outstanding Women Scientists Award, Indiana University, 2006
- Lucent Chairman's Award, 2005
- Pedersen Award Lecture, DuPont, 2005
- ACS PROGRESS Lectureship Award, University of Wisconsin at Madison, 2004
- Distinguished Women Scientists Lectureship, University of Texas at Austin, 2003
- New Investigator Award in Chemistry and Biology of Mineralized Tissues, 2001
- Arthur K. Doolittle Award of the American Chemical Society (ACS), 1999
- Award of the Max-Planck Society in Biology and Materials Science, Germany, 1995
