= CROPPS =

Research center

The Center for Research on Programmable Plant Systems (CROPPS) is a trans-disciplinary research center funded by the National Science Foundation to develop systems for two-way communication with plants. The program is led by Cornell University with partners at the University of Illinois, Urbana-Champaign, the University of Arizona, the Boyce Thompson Institute, Colorado State University and Tuskegee University. The project was launched in 2021.

The project aims to develop tools to listen and talk to plants and associated organisms that make up their microbiome; understand how plants interact and communicate, and grow a new field called digital biology. CROPPS combines research expertise from plant sciences, engineering, computer science, and the social sciences to form an integrated approach to plant biological research and translation.

== Leadership ==
CROPPS is led by Abraham Stroock, the Gordon L. Dibble '50 Professor in the Smith School of Chemical and Biomolecular Engineering in the College of Engineering, Cornell University. The founding director is Susan McCouch, the Barbara McClintock Professor of Plant Breeding and Genetics at the College of Agriculture and Life Sciences, Cornell University.
