= Cropp, Virginia =

Unincorporated community in Virginia, US

Coordinates: 38°28′26″N 77°36′36″W

Cropp is an unincorporated community in Stafford County, in the U.S. state of Virginia.
