= Wolf-Ulrich Cropp =

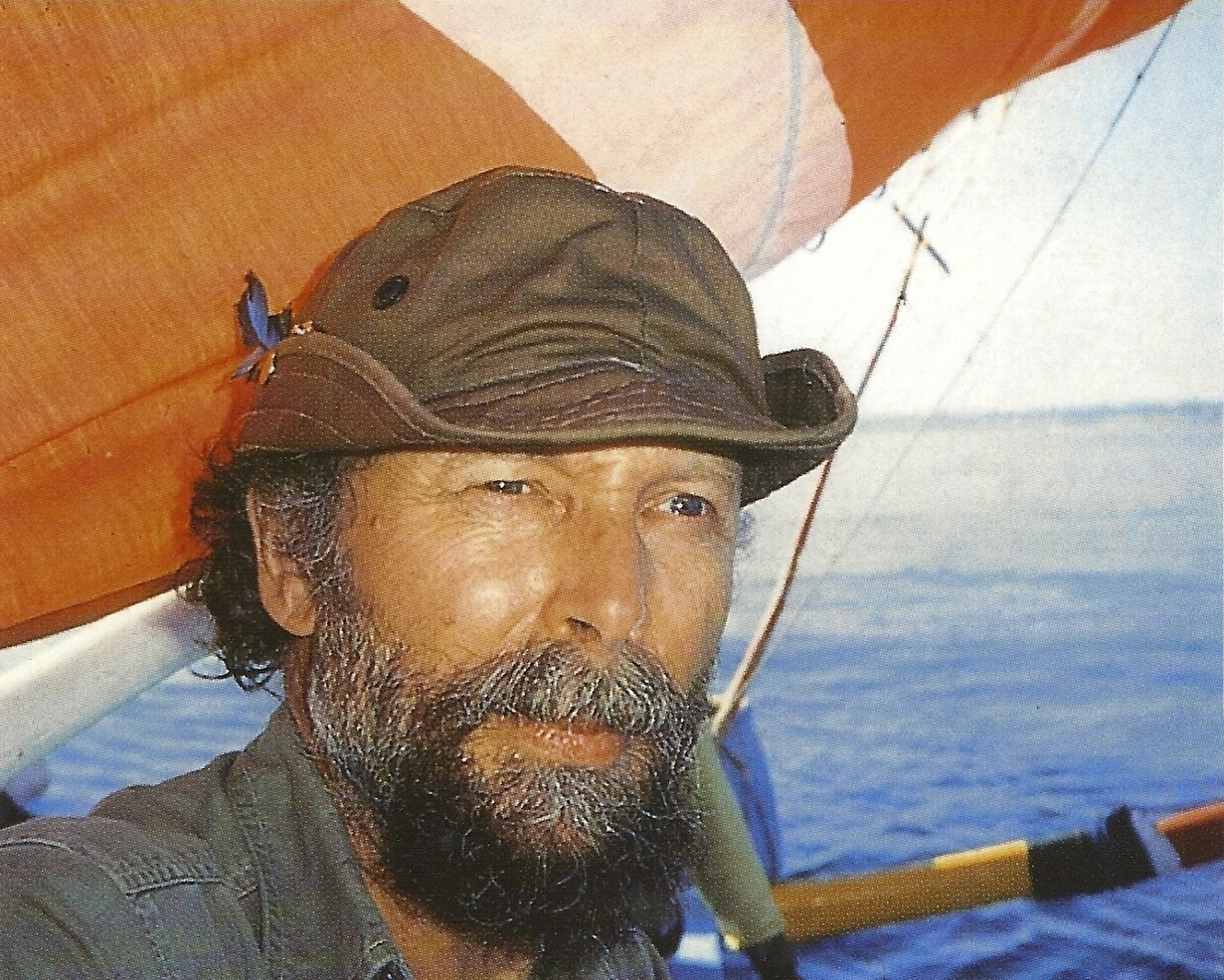
Wolf-Ulrich Cropp.

Wolf-Ulrich Cropp (born 25 July 1941 in Hamburg, Germany) is a German writer who, in his work as a businessman and authorized agent for national and international companies, travelled to every continent. He transcribed his experiences and impressions in 21 books, numerous articles, essays and short stories.

== Personal life ==
Cropp (who also uses the pen name Carl Conte), was born the son of an airplane engineer. After graduation from Gymnasium, Cropp studied civil engineering and business management, and graduated with a Diplom in civil engineering. In 1982, Cropp received an honorary degree in economics from LMU Munich.

Until 1996, he worked as chief executive and authorized agent for several major companies in Germany and abroad. In his spare time, he wrote books and scientific papers. After 1997, he devoted himself to writing and journalism. He has published 26 books, over 300 articles, reports, short stories and features and collaborated on several anthologies.

In 1983, Cropp's book, Alaska-Fieber (Alaska Fever) was named "Young Readers' Book of the Year" by the German Academy for Children's and Young People's Literature, in Volkach, Germany and in 2001, his book, Goldrausch in der Karibik (Goldrush in the Caribbean) was named "Book of the Year" by the reader's list of Die Welt.

In March 2002, Cropp was interviewed in Die Welt, about his son's proximity to an incident two days earlier in Kabul, Afghanistan that killed five coalition soldiers and injured eight. Two Germans were among the dead.

He is a member of the board of the Hamburg Authors' Union (German: Hamburger Autorenvereinigung e. V.) and a member of various associations and organizations, including the Overseas Club, the German-Czech Society (German: DeutscheTechnische Gesellschaft), the VS German Authors' Union (German: VS Verband Deutscher Schriftsteller), and the Friends of Foreign Education for officers at the Leadership Academy of the German Military (German: Freundeskreis Ausbildung ausländischer Offiziere an der Führungsakademie der Bundeswehr e. V.). He is a founding member of the Association for Help for Guinea-Bissau (German: Hilfe für Guinea Bissau e. V.), an organization for which he is engaged in humanitarian and diplomatic missions.

== Publications (partial list) ==
- Heisse Pfade (1977)
- Ölrausch in der Arktis (1977)
- Fangtage (1981)
- Hetzjagd durch Alaska (1981)
- Alaska-Fieber (1983) — Named Young Readers' Book of the Year
- Die Drachen leben noch (1984)
- Schwarze Trommeln (1989)
- Wüsten – Leben in der Todeszone (1992)
- Im Land der Mursi (1993)
- Mit der Bounty durch die Südsee (1996)
- Gletscher und Glut (1995)
- Die Batavia war ihr Schicksal (1996) ISBN 3-7688-1020-8
- Tunesien (1998)
- Sofort das richtige Fremdwort (1999)
- Goldrausch in der Karibik (2000) — Named Book of the Year, Die Welt Reader's List
- Das andere Fremdwörter-Lexikon (2002)
- Engel, Engel: Engel vor der Hölle (2003)
- ...denk ich an Hamburg: Hautnah (2004)
- Meere: Elizabeta (2005)
- Treffpunkt Kabul (2006)
- Querschnitte: Heimaterde (2009)
- Models und Mönche – Reise ins Innere Thailands, Wiesenburg-Verlag (2010) ISBN 978-3-940756-92-3
- Magisches Afrika – Mali, Wiesenburg-Verlag (2011) ISBN 978-3-942063-77-7
- Treffpunkt Kabul (Afghanistan), Wolf-Ulrich Cropp, alias Carl Conte, Edition HAV, printed DoD (2006), ISBN 3-8334-3911-4
- Dschungelfieber und Wüstenkoller, DUMONT-Verlag (2015), ISBN 978-3-7701-8268-8
- Wie ich die Prinzessin von Sansibar suchte ..., DUMONT-Verlag (2016), ISBN 978-3-7701-8280-0
- Im Schatten des Löwen, DUMONT-Verlag (2018), ISBN 978-3-7701-8295-4
- Jenseits der Westwelt, Kadera-Verlag (2018), ISBN 978-3944459-98-1
- Mali und die Dschinns der Wüste, Verlag Expeditionen (2019), ISBN 978-3-947911-20-2
- Eine Tigerfrau, Verlag Expeditionen (2020), ISBN 978-3-947911-39-4
- Kuba, Hemingway, eine Cohiba + ich, Verlag Expeditionen (2021), ISBN 978-3-947911-55-4
- Zwischen Hamburg + der Ferne, Verlag Expeditionen (2022), ISBN 978-3-947911-68-4

==Selected short stories==

- 'Engel vor der Hölle', Engel Engel, Verlag Langen Müller, Munich (2002), ISBN 3-7844-2855-X
- 'Hautnah', ... denk ich an Haamburg, Verlag Langen Müller, Munich (2004), ISBN 3-7844-2968-8
- 'Elizabetha', Meere, Verlag Langen Müller, Munich (2007), ISBN 978-3-7844-3083-6
- 'Weihnachten mit einem Lokführer', Weihnacht, Verlag Langen Müller, Munich (2010), ISBN 978-3-7844-3231-1
- 'Liebe in Zeiten von Corona', Alles Liebe?, ihleo verlag, Husum (2023), ISBN 978-3-96666-083-9

== Distinctions (partial list) ==
- 1982 Doctor of Economics, honoris causa, LMU Munich
- 1982 Bandera-Kreuz, Munich, Germany
- 1983 Young Readers' Book of the Year, German Academy for Children's and Young People's Literature, Volkach, Germany
- 1999 Lord of the Manor of Broadwas for special service as author about English seafaring stories
- 2001 Book of the Year 2000, Die Welt Reader's List
- 2009 Member of the Chilean Brotherhood of Caphorniers, for circumnavigating Cape Horn on board the Khersones in 1997 and the journalistic appraisal of the event
- 2013 Audience Award, Schriftsteller in Schleswig Holstein, Meldorf, Schleswig-Holstein, Germany
- 2019 Audience Award, Schriftsteller in Schleswig Holstein, Eckernförde, Schleswig-Holstein, Germany
