= Cropping =

Cropping may refer to:

- Cropping (punishment), the removal of a person's ears as a punishment
- Cropping (animal), cutting the ears of an animal shorter, usually trimming to shape the pinnae
- Docking (animal), cutting a part of an animal tail, less commonly used in reference to ears
- Cropping (image), removing unwanted outer parts of an image
- Scrapbooking, also called cropping, the creation of cards and or scrapbooks in unique and creative ways as a hobby

It may also mean:

- Crop farming
