= George M. Whitesides =

American chemist (1939–2026)

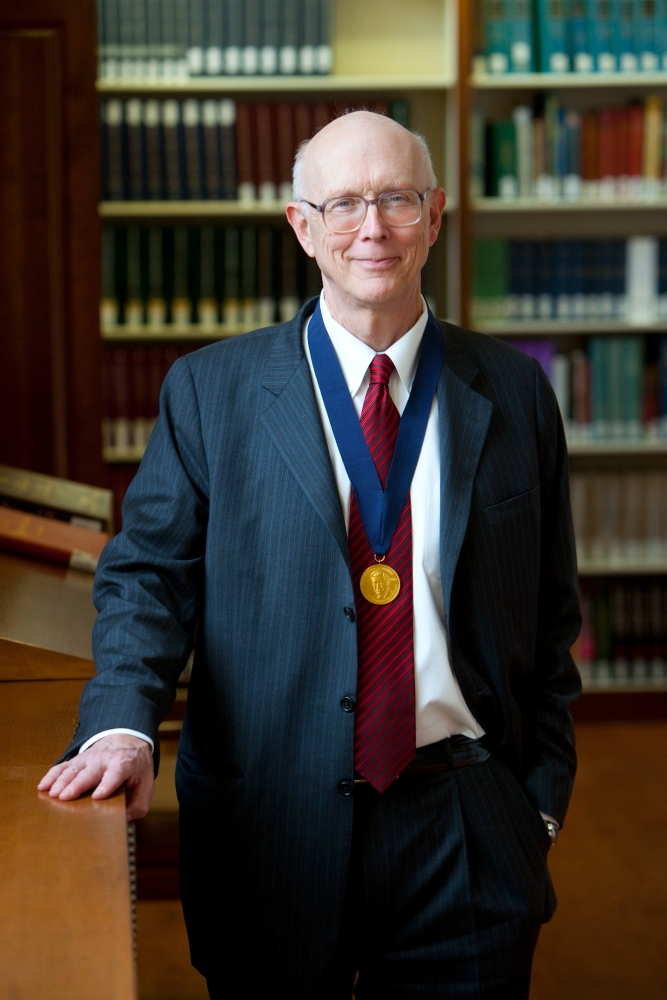
- Whitesides in 2010
- Born: August 3, 1939; Louisville, Kentucky, U.S.
- Died: November 19, 2026 (aged 87)
- Education: Harvard University (BA); California Institute of Technology (PhD)
- Known for: Corey–House–Posner–Whitesides reaction Contributions in the fields of NMR spectroscopy, organometallic chemistry, molecular self-assembly, soft lithography, microfabrication, microfluidics, soft robotics, paper-based analytical devices, and nanotechnology.
- Awards: ACS Award in Pure Chemistry (1975); Arthur C. Cope Award (1995); National Medal of Science (1998); Kyoto Prize (2003); Welch Award in Chemistry (2005); Dan David Prize (2005); Linus Pauling Award (2005); Priestley Medal (2007); Othmer Gold Medal (2010); King Faisal International Prize (2011); IRI Medal (2013); Kavli Prize (2022)
- Scientific career
- Fields: Chemistry
- Workplaces: Harvard University; Massachusetts Institute of Technology
- Thesis: The configurational stability of primary Grignard reagents. Applications of nuclear magnetic resonance spectroscopy to the study of molecular asymmetry (1964)
- Doctoral advisor: John D. Roberts
- Doctoral students: Craig L. Hill, Chi-Huey Wong, Younan Xia, Milan Mrksich Abraham Stroock
- Other notable students: Joanna Aizenberg, Tricia Carmichael, John A. Rogers, Firat Güder

George McClelland Whitesides (August 3, 1939 – November 19, 2026) was an American chemist and academic who was a professor of chemistry at Harvard University. He was best known for his work in the areas of nuclear magnetic resonance spectroscopy, organometallic chemistry, molecular self-assembly, soft lithography, microfabrication, microfluidics, and nanotechnology. A prolific author and patent holder who received many awards, he received the highest Hirsch index rating of all living chemists in 2011.

== Education ==
Whitesides attended secondary school at Phillips Academy and graduated in 1957. He received his A.B. degree from Harvard College in 1960 and earned a Ph.D. in chemistry from the California Institute of Technology in 1964, where he worked with John D. Roberts. At Caltech, Whitesides began working in organic chemistry. Whitesides' graduate work in organometallic chemistry used NMR spectroscopy and density matrices to study Grignard reagents. He used NMR spectroscopy to study rate of change of Grignard reagents and the structure of Grignard reagents in solution. He also studied spin–spin coupling in a variety of organic compounds, using density matrix calculations to examine the spin systems that NMR analyses detect.

== Career ==
=== Research at MIT ===
Whitesides began his independent career as an assistant professor at the Massachusetts Institute of Technology in 1963 and remained there until 1982. He continued his work with NMR spectroscopy and organometallic compounds, as well as working with polymers. Collaborations with biologists at MIT were an early influence informing his later work with biological systems. He is credited as having played a "pivotal role" in the development of the Corey–House–Posner–Whitesides reaction.

=== Research at Harvard ===
In 1982, Whitesides moved back to the Department of Chemistry at Harvard University, his alma mater, taking his laboratory with him. He was the Mallinckrodt Professor of Chemistry from 1982 to 2004. At Harvard, Whitesides has served as chairman of the Chemistry Department (1986–89) and Associate Dean of the Faculty of Arts and Sciences (1989–92).

=== Current research ===
External videos
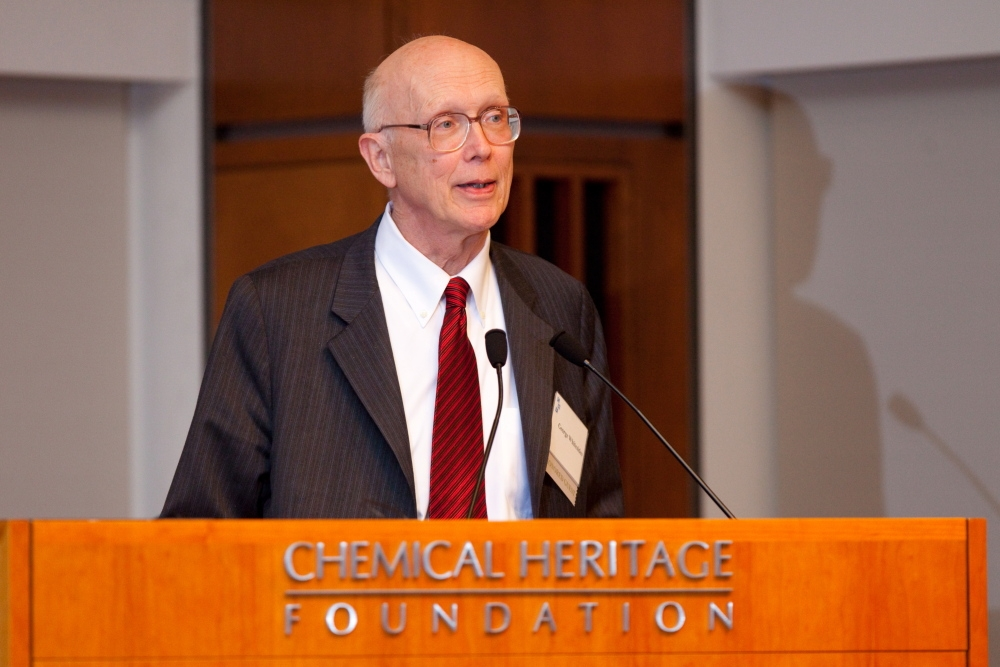
- Publishing Your Research 101 Impact of technology on scientific articles, George Whitesides, American Chemical Society, April 29, 2011
- Zero cost diagnostics George Whitesides, TEDxBoston, August 10, 2009
- Toward a science of simplicity, George Whitesides, TED, April 29, 2010
- Talking Nano: Perspectives on Nanotechnology (1 of 4), George Whitesides, Museum of Science, Boston, October 26, 2007
- The Courage to Go Off and Start New Things, George Whitesides, Science History Institute, June 17, 2010

In 2004, Whitesides was appointed the Woodford L. and Ann A. Flowers University Professor at Harvard, one of only 24 University Professorships at the institution as of 2014. The Whitesides Research Group at Harvard, an active research group of graduate and postdoctoral students with a lab space spanning more than 6,000 square feet (560 m2), was cofounded and directed by him. The single primary objective of his lab is "to fundamentally change the paradigms of science."

Whitesides' interests included "physical and organic chemistry, materials science, biophysics, complexity and emergence, surface science, microfluidics, optics, self-assembly, micro- and nanotechnology, science for developing economies, molecular electronics, catalysis, energy production and conservation, origin of life, rational drug design, cell-surface biochemistry, simplicity, and infochemistry." He has shifted to new research areas many times throughout his career, averaging about ten years in any particular area. Once other people successfully move into an area, he tends to look for new and more interesting problems to solve. "He has done that repeatedly by asking fundamental questions of what seemed to everyone to be virtually intractable problems," according to Jeremy R. Knowles.

Whitesides made scientific contributions in diverse areas, including nuclear magnetic resonance spectroscopy (NMR), microfluidics and nanotechnology. He is particularly well known for his work in materials and surface science. His work in surface chemistry has examined the 'self-assembly' processes of molecules arranging themselves on a surface. This work has become a basis for developments in nanoscience, electronics, pharmaceutical science and medical diagnostics. Some of his research has been visually presented through the collaboration On the Surface of Things: Images of the Extraordinary in Science with MIT science photographer Felice Frankel. One image, a pattern of blue and green water droplets created by Frankel, was featured on a 1992 cover of Science.

Early work by Ralph G. Nuzzo and David L. Allara on spontaneously organized molecular assemblies informed Whitesides' work on soft lithography. Whitesides and his research group have made significant contributions by developing techniques for soft lithography and microcontact printing. Both microscale and nanoscale techniques are based on printing, molding and embossing, and can be used for the fabrication of patterns and features on many different materials. Soft lithography uses a patterned elastomer as a stamp, mold, or mask to create micropatterns and microstructures. Such techniques have now become standard in the field.

Later research interests included energy, the origin of life, soft robotics, and science for developing economics.

He was also known for publishing his "outline system" for writing scientific papers.

== Policy and public service ==
Beyond his scientific research, Whitesides was also active in public service. He was part of the Committee on Science, Engineering, and Public Policy, which authored the National Academies' report Rising Above the Gathering Storm (2007). The report addressed U.S. competitiveness in science and technology. Two key challenges were identified as being essential to American scientific and engineering prowess: 1) creating high-quality jobs for Americans and 2) addressing the nation's need for clean, affordable, and reliable energy. The committee developed four areas of recommendations, with twenty specific proposals for implementable actions. Addressing human, financial, and informational issues, the report argued in favor of:

- improving K–12 science and mathematics education, to ensure that there is a pool of talented individuals who can work in the sciences
- supporting long-term basic research, to ensure the ongoing development of new ideas that will support the economy and enhance quality of life
- creating a positive environment for higher education in which America can develop, recruit, and retain students, scientists, and engineers from the United States and the rest of the world
- encouraging innovation through economic policies that will support manufacturing and marketing

In 2002, Whitesides served as the Chairman of the International Review Panel that evaluated the state of chemical research in the United Kingdom. Their findings were summarized what is now known as the Whitesides Report. They identified chemical biology and materials science as important areas for new development in the United Kingdom, and argued that chemistry is an important discipline in part because its concepts, processes and materials underlie other disciplines and offer opportunities to enhance communication between disciplines.

Whitesides served on advisory committees for the National Science Foundation, NASA, and the Department of Defense. He has also served on the National Research Council in various capacities since 1984, including stints on the Committee on Science and Technology for Counter Terrorism and the Committee on Nanotechnology for the Intelligence Community. He was also a member of the Reliance Innovation Council formed by Reliance Industries Limited, India.

In an article in Nature (2011), Whitesides and John M. Deutch challenged the scientific and chemical communities to become more relevant to current social and environmental issues. They criticized academic chemistry for an "increasingly incurious and risk-averse attitude" and for focusing on "familiar questions of familiar disciplines" rather than taking a broad interdisciplinary view and exploring new areas. They recommended that institutions focus on practical problems, and teach entrepreneurial skills along with basic science so as to stimulate the development of practical technologies, encouraging students to take ownership of their own research. A similar approach is taken by the Whitesides Research Group, of which John A. Rogers has said, "Chemistry was the core expertise that provided the competitive advantage, but there was no sense of chemistry as a narrowly defined discipline. It was chemistry to solve problems, not necessarily to do chemistry." The article sparked strong reactions both for and against their ideas. Many in the scientific community asserted that research agendas should be "disinterested" and that education must focus on fundamental research to advance. Whitesides and Deutch argued that teaching science in ways that address current issues can still lead to foundational work and scientific breakthroughs.

== Personal life and death ==
Whitesides and his wife, Barbara, had two sons, George T. and Ben. George Thomas Whitesides was CEO of Virgin Galactic, a firm developing commercial space vehicles. Ben Whitesides is lead singer and songwriter of The Joggers, a rock band based in Portland, Oregon.

Whitesides died on November 19, 2026, at the age of 87.

== Awards and achievements ==
Whitesides was the author of more than 1200 scientific articles and is listed as an inventor on at least 134 patents. He ranked 5th on Thomson ISI's list of the 1000 most cited chemists from 1981 to 1997, and 38th on the list from 2000 to 2010. According to the Hirsch index, a ranking which combines number of articles published and citations of those articles by others, he was the most influential living chemist in 2011.

He co-founded over 12 companies with a combined market capitalization of over $20 billion. These companies include Genzyme, GelTex, Theravance, Surface Logix, Nano Terra, and WMR Biomedical. Whitesides has mentored more than 300 graduate students, postdocs, and visiting scholars. He served on the editorial advisory boards of several scientific journals, including ACS Nano, Angewandte Chemie, Chemistry & Biology, and Small.

Whitesides was a member of the American Academy of Arts and Sciences, the National Academy of Sciences, and the National Academy of Engineering. He was also a fellow of the American Association for the Advancement of Science and the American Philosophical Society. In 2002 he became foreign member of the Royal Netherlands Academy of Arts and Sciences. He also became a foreign member of the Norwegian Academy of Science and Letters.

Among other awards, Whitesides was the recipient of the American Chemical Society's ACS Award in Pure Chemistry (1975), the Arthur C. Cope Award (1995), National Medal of Science (1998), the Kyoto Prize in Materials Science and Engineering (2003), the Gabbay Award (2004), the Dan David Prize (2005), the Welch Award in Chemistry (2005), the AIC Gold Medal (2007), and the Priestley Medal (2007), the highest honor conferred by the ACS.

Whitesides later received the 2009 Dreyfus Prize in the Chemical Sciences from The Camille and Henry Dreyfus Foundation on September 30, 2009, for his creation of new materials that have significantly advanced the field of chemistry and its societal benefits. In November 2009, he was recipient of the Reed M. Izatt and James J. Christensen Lectureship. Also in 2009, George Whitesides was awarded the 2009 Benjamin Franklin Medal in Chemistry by The Franklin Institute in Philadelphia, for his pioneering chemical research in molecular self-assembly and innovative nanofabrication techniques that have resulted in rapid, inexpensive fabrication of ultra small devices.

He received the Othmer Gold Medal for outstanding contributions to progress in chemistry and science in 2010. He was awarded the F. A. Cotton Medal for Excellence in Chemical Research of the American Chemical Society in 2011. In 2011 he also received the King Faisal International Prize in Chemistry. In 2013 he was awarded the IRI Medal alongside Robert S. Langer. In 2013 he gave the inaugural Patrusky Lecture. In 2017, he was awarded the Lifetime Achievement award by Xconomy. In 2022 he received the Kavli Prize in Nanosciences.

In 2015, he received an honorary doctorate from the University of Bath.
