= LUC7L3 =

Protein-coding gene in the species Homo sapiens

Identifiers
- Aliases: LUC7L3, CRA, CREAP-1, CROP, LUC7A, OA48-18, hLuc7A, LUC7 like 3 pre-mRNA splicing factor
- External IDs: OMIM: 609434; MGI: 1914934; HomoloGene: 75056; GeneCards: LUC7L3; OMA:LUC7L3 - orthologs

Gene location (Human)
Chr.	Chromosome 17 (human)
Band	17q21.33	Start	50,719,565 bp
Band	17q21.33	End	50,756,219 bp

Gene location (Mouse)
Chr.	Chromosome 11 (mouse)
Band	11|11 D	Start	94,178,716 bp
Band	11|11 D	End	94,212,814 bp
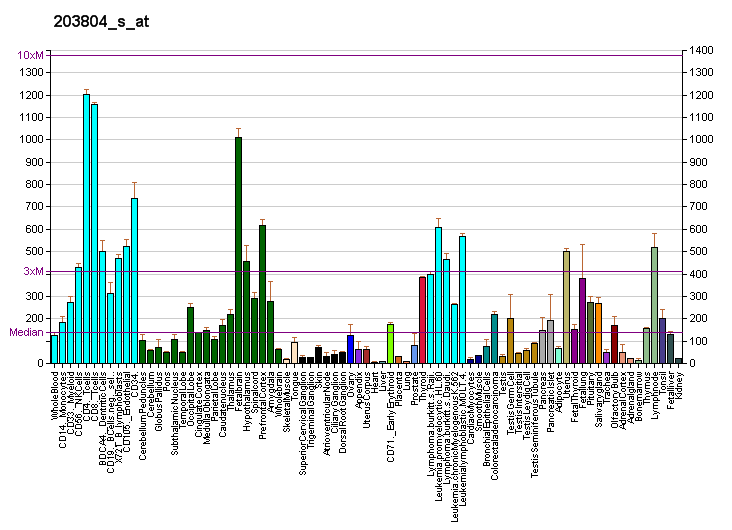

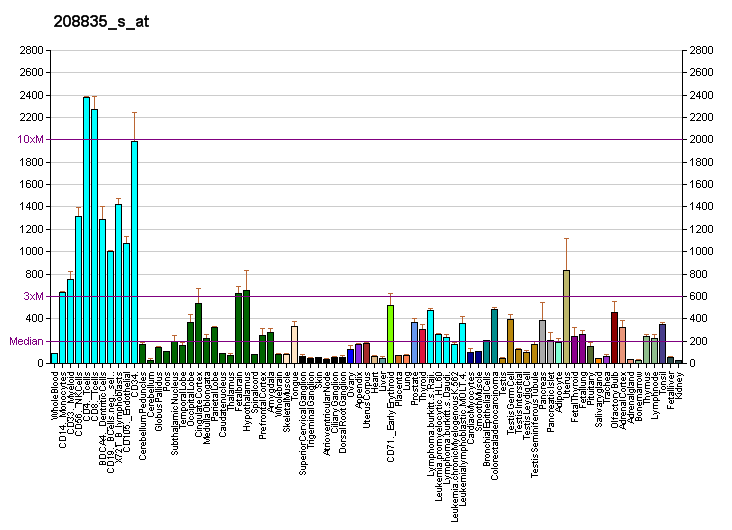

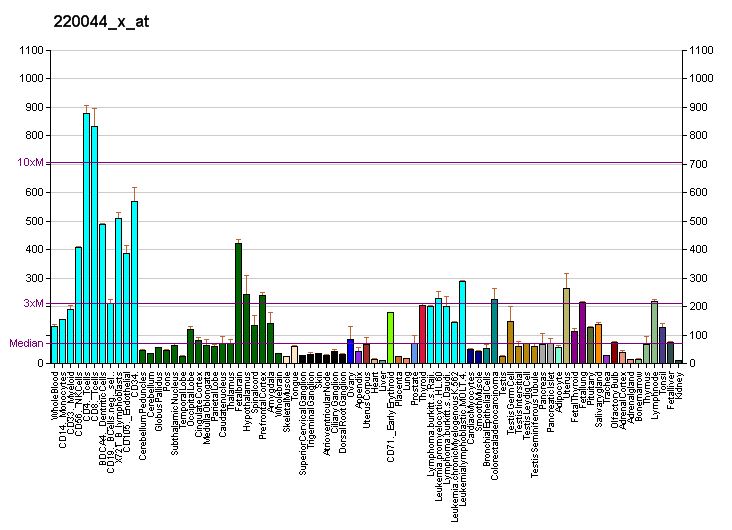
RNA expression pattern
Bgee	Human / Mouse (ortholog); Top expressed in: pylorus; sural nerve; right hemisphere of cerebellum; endothelial cell; cardia; tibia; cerebellar vermis; left ovary; seminal vesicula; corpus callosum / Top expressed in: medullary collecting duct; genital tubercle; Rostral migratory stream; Paneth cell; renal corpuscle; tail of embryo; ciliary body; retinal pigment epithelium; neural layer of retina; fossa; More reference expression data
BioGPS	More reference expression data
Gene ontology
Molecular function	DNA binding; protein binding; mRNA binding; RNA binding
Cellular component	U1 snRNP; U2-type prespliceosome; nucleus; nucleoplasm; nuclear speck
Biological process	mRNA processing; mRNA splice site selection; RNA splicing
Sources:Amigo / QuickGO
Orthologs
Species	Human	Mouse
Entrez	51747	67684
Ensembl	ENSG00000108848	ENSMUSG00000020863
UniProt	O95232	Q5SUF2
RefSeq (mRNA)	NM_006107; NM_016424; NM_001330330	NM_026313; NM_001361573; NM_001361574; NM_001361575
RefSeq (protein)	NP_001317259; NP_006098; NP_057508	NP_080589; NP_001348502; NP_001348503; NP_001348504
Location (UCSC)	Chr 17: 50.72 – 50.76 Mb	Chr 11: 94.18 – 94.21 Mb
PubMed search
- Wikidata
View/Edit Human	View/Edit Mouse

LUC7 like 3 pre-mRNA splicing factor (LUC7L3), also known as Cisplatin resistance-associated overexpressed protein, or CROP, is a human gene.

This gene encodes a cisplatin resistance-associated overexpressed protein (CROP). The N-terminal half of the CROP contains cysteine/histidine motifs and leucine zipper-like repeats, and the C-terminal half is rich in arginine and glutamate residues (RE domain) and arginine and serine residues (RS domain). This protein localizes with a speckled pattern in the nucleus, and could be involved in the formation of splicesome via the RE and RS domains. Two alternatively spliced transcript variants encoding the same protein have been found for this gene.
