= Susan McCouch =

American geneticist

- Born: Susan Rutherford McCouch; 1953 (age 72–73)
- Education: Smith College (BA); University of Massachusetts (MS); Cornell University (PhD)
- Awards: Member of the National Academy of Sciences (2018)
- Scientific career
- Fields: Plant genetics Rice; Evolution; Plant genomics Population biology
- Workplaces: Cornell University; International Rice Research Institute
- Thesis: Construction and applications of a molecular linkage map of rice based on restriction fragment length polymorphism (RFLP) (1990)
- Doctoral advisor: Steven D. Tanksley
- Website: cals.cornell.edu/susan-r-mccouch

Susan Rutherford McCouch (born 1953) is an American geneticist specializing in the genetics of rice. She is known for developing the first molecular genetic map of rice and for her role in turning rice into a model for genetics and breeding research. She is the Barbara McClintock Professor of Plant Breeding and Genetics at Cornell University, and since 2018 a member of the National Academy of Sciences. In 2012, she was awarded the Chancellor's Award for Excellence in Scholarship and Creative Activities.

== Education ==
McCouch completed her Bachelor of Arts degree in Hispanic Studies at Smith College in 1975. She went on to receive her Master of Science degree in plant pathology from the University of Massachusetts in 1982. McCouch completed her PhD at Cornell University in 1990, where her research was supervised by Steven D. Tanksley.

== Career ==
After receiving her PhD, McCouch worked with the International Rice Research Institute in the Philippines until 1995. She then joined the Cornell faculty in the departments of plant breeding and genetics, plant biology, biological statistics, and computational biology. Her research interests are in plant genetics, rice, evolution, plant genomics and population biology. Her research has identified the genetic mechanisms used by rice to survive long-term flooding, and the development of a new cultivar of red rice.

In 2021, McCouch led the founding of the Center for Research on Programmable Plant Systems (CROPPS), a Science and Technology Center at Cornell University funded by the National Science Foundation. CROPPS was established as a partnership between Cornell, the University of Illinois Urbana-Champaign, the University of Arizona and the Boyce Thompson Institute. The Center enables the study of how plants perceive and react to their environments with the long-term objective of facilitating two-way communication with plants.

=== Awards and honors ===
She was awarded the Chancellor's Award for Excellence in Scholarship and Creative Activities (2012) and elected a member of the National Academy of Sciences (NAS) in 2018.
