= Wei Gao (engineer) =

American medical engineer

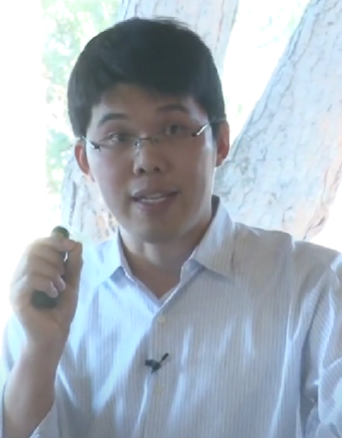
- Born: Xuzhou, China
- Education: Huazhong University of Science and Technology (BS); Tsinghua University (MS); University of California, San Diego (PhD)
- Scientific career
- Fields: Medical engineering Nanotechnology
- Workplaces: California Institute of Technology; University of California, Berkeley
- Thesis: Synthetic Micro/Nanomachines and Their Applications: Towards "Fantastic Voyage" (2014)
- Doctoral advisor: Joseph Wang
- Other academic advisors: Ali Javey (postdoctoral advisor)
- Website: www.gao.caltech.edu

Wei Gao is a Chinese-American biomedical engineer who currently serves as a professor of medical engineering at the California Institute of Technology (Caltech). Gao has been a professor at Caltech since 2017 and is an associate editor of the journals Science Advances, Biosensors and Bioelectronics, npj Flexible Electronics (Nature), Journal on Flexible Electronics (IEEE), and Sensors & Diagnosis (Royal Society of Chemistry).

Gao's research in wearable biosensors and human-machine interfaces for robotic sensing has earned numerous awards, such as the NSF CAREER Award, IAMBE Early Career Award, and the Sloan Research Fellowship.

== Early life and education ==
Gao was born in a small village in Xuzhou, China where he was motivated to design wearable health monitors after witnessing many locals die from various diseases. Gao credits the 1966 science fiction film, Fantastic Voyage, as his inspiration to use nanotechnology to develop noninvasive medical treatments and wearable devices for monitoring health conditions. Gao attended Huazhong University of Science and Technology where he earned a B.S. in Mechanical Engineering in 2007. Gao went on to earn a M.S. from Tsinghua University, and a Ph.D. from the University of California, San Diego where he studied under Dr. Joseph Wang, a leader in nanoengineering. Following graduation, Gao worked with Ali Javey at the University of California, Berkeley as a postdoctoral scholar where he studied human perspiration sampling for integrated wearable sensor arrays.

== Research and career ==
Gao joined Caltech as an Assistant Professor of medical engineering in 2017. His research focuses on the development of bioelectronic devices and sensors for personalized health monitoring applications. To this end, he and his lab have developed sensors powered by human sweat that transmit information to a user's cell phone through Bluetooth communication. These sensors have been shown to indicate stress levels and metabolic conditions such as gout, and detect COVID infection status and immunity.

Gao's research also involves the biomimetic integration of artificial skin (e-skin) with robotics to provide robots with the ability to sense temperature and pressure. The sensors, fully printed on an electronic interface, allow for ultra-sensitive robotic perception. In addition to external sensors, Gao's lab has developed micro-robotic motors for deep tissue imaging and drug delivery applications. The micromotors, enveloped in microcapsules, were guided in trials by a photoacoustic computed tomography (PACT) process which allowed for in vivo investigation of the motors as they travelled through mouse intestines. Near-infrared light irradiation was then used to disintegrate the microcapsules to release the micromotors, which then migrated toward targeted regions.

== Awards and recognition ==
- 2023 - Falling Walls Breakthrough of the Year in Engineering and Technology
- 2022 - IAMBE Early Career Award
- 2022 - NSF Career Award
- 2022 - Pittcon Achievement Award
- 2021 - Highly Cited Researcher 2021 (Web of Science)
- 2021 - ONR Young Investigator Award
- 2021 - 3M Non-Tenured Faculty Award
- 2021 - Alfred P. Sloan Research Fellowship
- 2020 - Highly Cited Researcher 2020 (Web of Science)
- 2020 - IEEE EMBS Early Career Achievement Award
- 2020 - World Economic Forum Young Scientist
- 2019 - IEEE Sensors Council Technical Achievement Award
- 2016 - MIT Technology Review Innovators Under 35

== External media and links ==
- Gao's Profile at Caltech
- Wei Gao publications indexed by Google Scholar
- Wei Gao Publications indexed by ResearchGate
- Gao's ORCID Profile
- Earnest C. Watson Lecture, 2023. "Wearable Biosensors and the Future of Personalized Medicine"
- Kavli Nanoscience Institute Special Seminar, 2021. "Telemedicine Biosensors for Personalized Healthcare"
