= Fortino =

Fortino may refer to:

== Given name ==
- Fortino Hipólito Vera y Talonia (1834–1898), Mexican Catholic bishop
- Fortino Jaime (1881/1883–1951), Mexican publisher
- Fortino Sámano (died 1917), Mexican army captain
- Fortino Carrillo Sandoval (born 1959), Mexican politician

== Surname ==
- Brianna Fortino (born 1993), American mixed martial artist
- Eleuterio Francesco Fortino (1938–2010), Italian priest
- Giancarlo Fortino, Italian computer scientist
- Laura Fortino (born 1991), Italian-Canadian ice hockey defenceman
- Rodolfo Fortino (born 1983), Italian futsal player

== Places ==
- Fortino Tenaglia Lighthouse, in Campania
- Punta del Fortino Lighthouse, in Campania
- Fortino di Mazzallakkar, fort in Sicily

== See also ==
- Fortini, surname
- Fortinos, supermarket chain in Canada
