= Ayusman Sen =

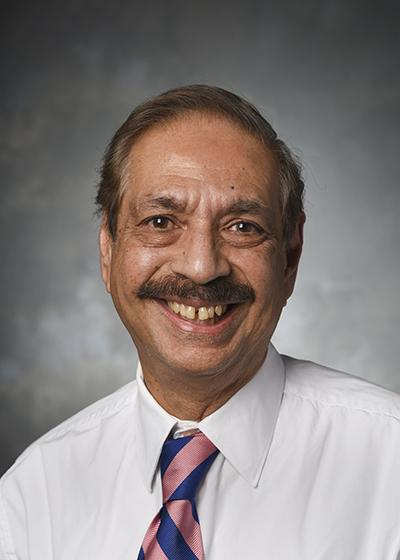
- Sen in 2024
- Education: University of Calcutta (B.Sc), Indian Institute of Technology Kanpur (M.Sc), University of Chicago (PhD)
- Scientific career
- Fields: Catalysis, polymer science, active autonomous systems, synthetic nanomotors and micromotors, micropumps, nanotechnology, and systems chemistry
- Thesis: Chemistry of tertiary phosphine complexes of Platinum (0) and Platinum (II), and their role in catalytic oxidation (1979)
- Doctoral advisor: Jack Halpern
- Other academic advisors: John E. Bercaw
- Website: science.psu.edu/chem/people/axs20

Ayusman Sen is the Verne M. Willaman Professor of Chemistry, with appointments at the Departments of Chemical Engineering, and Materials Science & Engineering at the Pennsylvania State University. He received a $25,000 award in 1984 from the Alfred P. Sloan Foundation.

== Early life and education ==
Sen was born in Calcutta, India. He received his B.Sc from University of Calcutta after which he obtained his M.Sc from Indian Institute of Technology Kanpur. He received his PhD from the University of Chicago in 1978 under the direction of Jack Halpern followed by a year of postdoctoral research with John E.Bercaw at the California Institute of Technology.

== Career ==
He joined the faculty at the Penn State in 1979, where he served as the Head of the Chemistry Department from 2004 to 2009. Sen was elected a Fellow of the American Association for the Advancement of Science in 2005 and the Royal Society of Chemistry in 2015.

His research interests during his career have encompassed catalysis, polymer science, active autonomous systems, synthetic nanomotors and micromotors, micropumps, nanotechnology and systems chemistry.

Prof. Sen is also Adjunct Professor at the International Centre for Materials Science, Jawaharlal Nehru Centre for Advanced Scientific Research. He was the Iberdrola Visiting Professor at the University of Valladolid, the Coochbehar Professor at the Indian Association for the Cultivation of Science, and Distinguished Scientist at the National Institute for Materials Science. Sen serves on the scientific advisory boards of the Department of Chemistry, Indian Institute of Technology Kanpur and the Max Planck Institute for Intelligent Systems.

He has explained what he calls his own "irrational interest" in science with a quote from Henry Moore: "The secret of life is to have a task, something you devote your entire life to, something you bring everything to, every minute of the day for the rest of your life. And the most important thing is, it must be something you cannot possibly do."

He has published more than 420 manuscripts in peer-reviewed journals with an h-index of 105 and holds 25 patents. He has mentored over 56 graduate students and 14 postdocs.

== Selected Honors and Awards ==
- 1982 - 84 Young Investigator Award, Chevron Research Company
- 1984 - 88 Alfred P. Sloan Research Fellow
- 1987 - 88 Paul J. Flory Award, IBM
- 1993 Imperial Oil Distinguished Lecturer, University of Toronto
- 1999 - 00 Iberdrola Visiting Professor, University of Valladolid, Spain
- 2000 Keynote Speaker, IUPAC International Conference on Organometallic Chemistry, Shanghai, China
- 2002 Gerhard Closs Lecturer, University of Chicago
- 2003 Faculty Scholar Medal, Pennsylvania State University
- 2005 Plenary Lecturer, Volkswagen Conference on Nanotechnology in Science, Economy, and Society, Marburg, Germany
- 2005 Coochbehar Professorship, Indian Association for the Cultivation of Science, Kolkata, India
- 2005 Plenary Lecturer, IUPAC Workshop on Advanced Materials, Stellenbosch, South Africa
- 2005 Elected Fellow, American Association for the Advancement of Science
- 2008 Plenary Lecturer, International Workshop on Defining Issues in Biofuels R&D, Italy
- 2009 Invited Distinguished Scientist, National Institute for Materials Science, Japan
- 2010 - Adjunct Professor, International Centre for Materials Science, Jawaharlal Nehru Centre for Advanced Scientific Research, India
- 2010 Plenary Lecturer, Sitges Conference on Statistical Mechanics, Spain
- 2011 Medal, Chemical Research Society of India (CRSI)
- 2011 Member, Advisory Committee, Department of Chemistry, Indian Institute of Technology Kanpur
- 2013 Member, Scientific Advisory Board, Max Planck Institute for Intelligent Systems, Germany
- 2015 Elected Fellow, Royal Society of Chemistry
- 2017 Langmuir Lecture, Institute of Nano Science and Technology, India
- 2019 Langmuir Lecture Award, American Chemical Society
- 2019 Humboldt Prize, Alexander von Humboldt Foundation
- 2023 - Steering Committee, International Conference on Manipulation, Automation, and Robotics on Small Scales (MARSS)

== Selected publications ==
- "Novel Palladium(II) Catalyzed Copolymerization of Carbon Monoxide with Olefins," A. Sen, T-W. Lai, J. Am. Chem. Soc., 1982, 104, 3520-3522.
- "Palladium(II) Catalyzed Copolymerization of Carbon Monoxide with Ethylene. Direct Evidence for a Single Mode of Stepwise Chain Growth," T.-W. Lai, A. Sen, Organometallics, 1984, 3, 866-870.
- "Mechanistic Aspects of Metal-Catalyzed Alternating Copolymerization of Olefins with Carbon Monoxide," A. Sen, Acc. Chem. Res., 1993, 26, 303-310.
- "Direct Catalytic Conversion of Methane to Acetic Acid in Aqueous Medium," M. Lin, A. Sen, Nature, 1994, 368, 613-615.
- "Catalytic Carbon-Carbon and Carbon-Hydrogen Bond Cleavage in Lower Alkanes. Low Temperature, Hydroxylations and Hydroxycarbonylations Using Dioxygen as the Oxidant," M. Lin, T. E. Hogan, A. Sen, J. Am. Chem. Soc., 1996, 118, 4574-4580.
- “A Highly Catalytic Bimetallic System for the Low Temperature Selective Oxidation of Methane and Lower Alkanes using Dioxygen as the Oxidant,” M. Lin, T. Hogan, A. Sen, J. Am. Chem. Soc., 1997, 119, 6048-6053.
- “Catalytic Functionalization of Carbon-Hydrogen and Carbon-Carbon Bonds in Protic Media,” A. Sen, Acc. Chem. Res., 1998, 31, 550-557.
- "Catalytic Nanomotors: Autonomous Movement of Striped Nanorods," W. F. Paxton, K. C. Kistler, A. Sen, J. Am. Chem. Soc., 2004, 126, 41, 13424–13431.
- “Silver Bromide Nanoparticle/Polymer Composites: Dual Action Tunable Antimicrobial Materials,” V. Sambhy, M. M. MacBride, B. R. Peterson, A. Sen, J. Am. Chem. Soc., 2006, 128, 9798-9808.
- “Multifunctional Silane Polymers for Persistent Surface Derivatization and Their Antimicrobial Properties,” V. Sambhy, B. R. Peterson, A. Sen, Langmuir, 2008, 4, 7549-7558.
- “Antibacterial and Hemolytic Activities of Pyridinium Polymers as a Function of the Spatial Relationship between the Positive Charge and the Pendant Alkyl Tail,” V. Sambhy, B. R. Peterson, A. Sen, Angew. Chem. Int. Ed., 2008, 47, 1250-1254.
- "Substrate Catalysis Enhances Single-Enzyme Diffusion," H. S. Muddana, S. Sengupta, A. Sen, J. Am. Chem. Soc., 2010, 132, 7, 2110–2111.
- “Substrate-driven Chemotactic Assembly in an Enzyme Cascade,” X. Zhao, H. Palacci, V. Yadav, M. M. Spiering, M. K. Gilson, P. J. Butler, H. Hess, S. J. Benkovic, A. Sen, Nature Chemistry, 2018, 10, 311-317.
- “Positive and Negative Chemotaxis of Enzyme-coated Liposome Motors,” A. Somasundar, S. Ghosh, F. Mohajerani, L. N. Massenburg, T. Yang, P. S. Cremer, D. Velegol, A. Sen, Nature Nanotech., 2019, 14, 1129-1134.
- “Kinetic Asymmetry versus Dissipation in the Evolution of Chemical Systems as Exemplified by Single Enzyme Chemotaxis,” N. S. Mandal, A. Sen, R. D. Astumian, J. Am. Chem. Soc., 2023, 145, 5730-5738.
- “A Molecular Origin of Non-reciprocal Interactions Between Interacting Active Catalysts,” N. S. Mandal, A. Sen, R. D. Astumian, Chem, 2024, 10, 1147-1159.
