= Tenaglia =

Tenaglia is an Italian surname. Notable people with the surname include:

- Danny Tenaglia (born 1961), American DJ and record producer
- John Tenaglia (born 1964), American opera singer
- Nahuel Tenaglia (born 1996), Argentine footballer

== See also ==
- Porta Tenaglia
- Fortino Tenaglia Lighthouse
- Filippo Tanaglia
