= IEEE Sensors Council Technical Achievement Award =

Electrical engineering award

- Awarded for: Outstanding technical contribution within the scope of IEEE Sensors Council.
- Presented by: Institute of Electrical and Electronics Engineers
- First award: 2008
- Website: IEEE Sensors Awards

The IEEE Sensors Council Technical Achievement Award honors a person with outstanding technical contributions within the scope of the IEEE Sensors Council, as documented by publications and patents. The award is based on the general quality and originality of the contributions. At the moment, four awards are given every year. This kind of award honors a person with outstanding technical contributions within the scope of the IEEE Sensors Council, as documented by publications and patents. It is based on the general quality and originality of contributions. The winner of this award is presented with a plaque and $2,000 check. Awards are available in two fields: the field of "Sensors" and the field of "Systems or Networks"; within each field, an Early Career and an Advanced Career are given every year. Early Career awards are for individuals within 15 years of receiving the first degree. Advanced Career awards are for individuals beyond 15 years of the first degree.

== Recipients ==
- 2021: Asad Madni (Systems or Networks – Advanced Career)
- 2021: Katarzyna Wac (Systems or Networks – Early Career)
- 2021: Joseph Wang (Sensors – Advanced Career)
- 2021: Muhammad Akram Karimi (Sensors – Early Career)
- 2020: Laurence Yang (Systems or Networks – Advanced Career)
- 2020: Domenico Ciuonzo (Systems or Networks – Early Career)
- 2020: Eui-Hyeok Yang (Sensors – Advanced Career)
- 2020: Sheng Xu (Sensors – Early Career)
- 2019: Paul C.-P. Chao (Systems or Networks – Advanced Career)
- 2019: Changzhan Gu (Systems or Networks – Early Career)
- 2019: Wei Gao (Sensors – Early Career)
- 2019: Ellis Meng (Sensors - Advanced Career)
- 2018: Gerard L. Coté (Sensors - Advanced Career)
- 2018: Ashwin Seshia (Systems or Networks – Advanced Career)
- 2018: Daniele Tosi (Sensors - Early Career)
- 2018: Omer Tolga Inan (Systems or Networks – Early Career)
- 2017: Kourosh Kalantar-zadeh (Sensors - Advanced Career)
- 2017: Deepak Uttamchandani (Systems or Networks – Advanced Career)
- 2017: Yu Shrike Zhang (Sensors - Early Career)
- 2017: Pantelis Georgiou (Systems or Networks – Early Career)
- 2016: Xin Zhang (Sensors - Advanced Career)
- 2016: Sandro Carrara (Systems or Networks – Advanced Career)
- 2016: Ravinder S. Dahiya (Sensors - Early Career)
- 2016: Changzhi Li (Systems or Networks – Early Career)
- 2015: John Kirching (Sensors - Advanced Career)
- 2015: Mina Rais-Zadeh (Sensors - Early Career)
- 2014: Tony Jun Huang
- 2013: Khalil Najafi
- 2012: Wen H. Ko
- 2011: Tom Kenny
- 2010: Brian Cunningham
- 2009: Andrei Shkel
- 2008: Michael Shur
