= Fortini =

Fortini is an Italian surname. Notable people with the name include:

- Franco Fortini, pseudonym of Franco Lattes, (1917–1994), Italian poet, writer, translator, essayist, literary critic and Marxist intellectual
- Patricia Fortini Brown (born 1936), American Episcopalian and Professor Emerita of Art & Archaeology at Princeton University
- Riccardo Fortini (1957–2009), Italian high jumper

== See also ==
- Fortini Ground, is the home ground of Maltese football club Vittoriosa Stars F.C.
- Fortino (disambiguation)
