= Marion C. Thurnauer =

American chemist (born 1945)

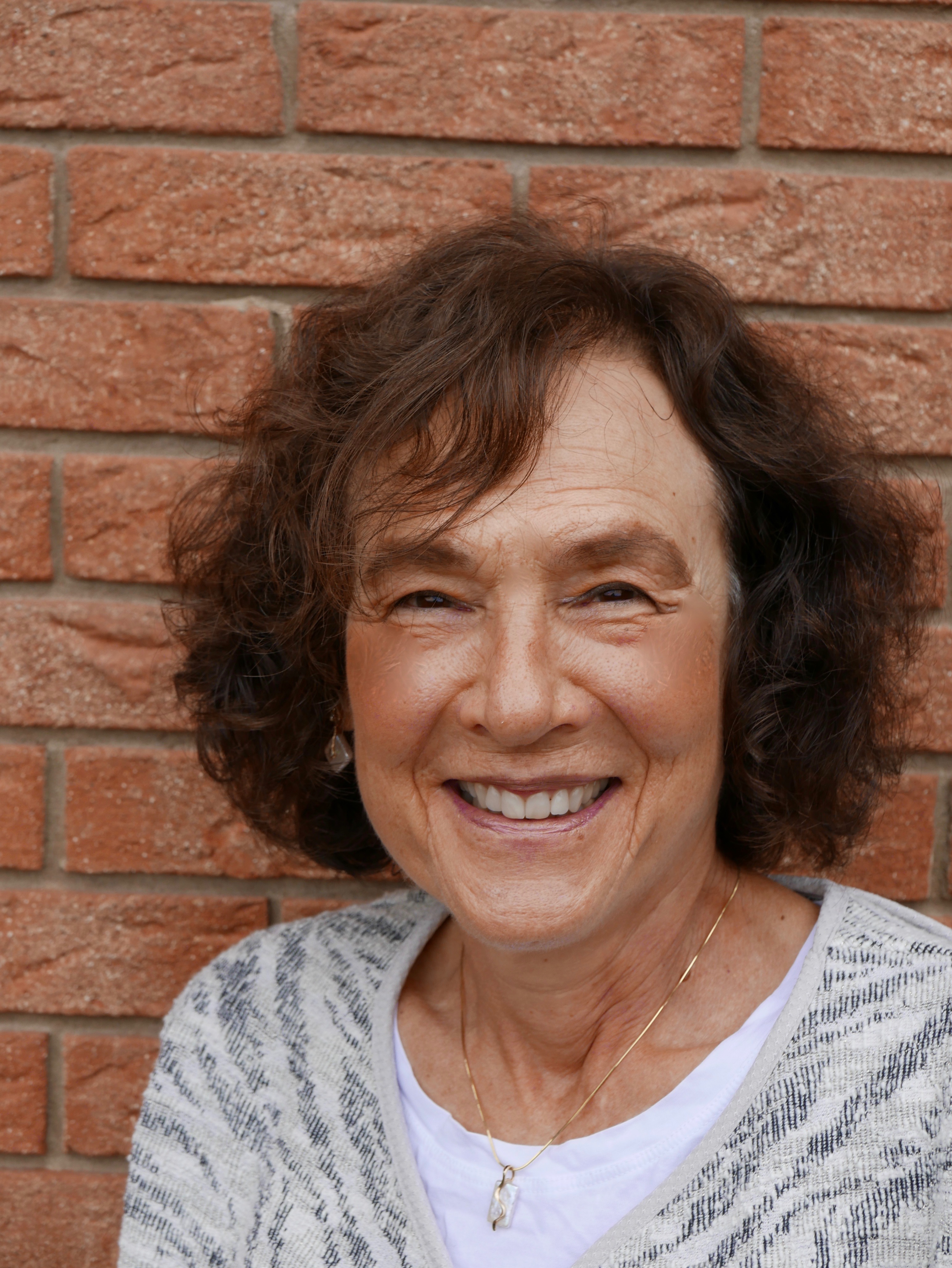
- Thurnauer, presenting to the Women Chemists Committee at the ACS National Meeting, Philadelphia, 2016
- Born: Chattanooga, Tennessee
- Education: University of Chicago
- Known for: photosynthesis, electron paramagnetic resonance, women in science
- Spouse: Alexander Trifunac
- Awards: Garvan–Olin Medal (2001)
- Scientific career
- Fields: Chemistry
- Workplaces: Argonne National Laboratory, Chemistry Division
- Doctoral advisor: Gerhard L. Closs

Marion Charlotte Thurnauer is an American chemist at Argonne National Laboratory (Argonne). She was the first woman director of the Chemistry Division (CHM) and the first woman division director in the Physical Sciences Directorate at Argonne. She is an Argonne Distinguished Fellow Emeritus in the Chemical Sciences and Engineering Division and has received numerous awards for her work in chemistry and her support of women in science.

== Early life and education ==
Marion Thurnauer was born in Chattanooga, Tennessee, later moving to Minnesota. Her father, Hans Thurnauer was a ceramic engineer. Her mother, Lotte Oettinger Thurnauer, died in 1959, while Marion was still young. One of her aunts, Luise Herzberg, was an astrophysicist. Thurnauer credits family interests in science as a formative influence.

She received her B.A. (1968), M.S. (1969) and Ph.D. (1974) in chemistry, from the University of Chicago. Thurnauer credits her future husband, Alexander Trifunac with suggesting she study chemistry, rather than initially pursue her interest in biology, and learn the physical techniques of chemistry that could then be applied to biological systems.

Thurnauer's doctoral thesis advisor was Gerhard L. Closs. For her thesis work, she studied magnetic interactions in radical pairs using electron paramagnetic resonance (EPR). The final experiments for her thesis research were conducted with an EPR spectrometer at Argonne because equipment at the University of Chicago had been damaged in an explosion. Subsequent to this ‘unfortunate’ event she was offered a postdoctoral position in the Chemistry Division at Argonne.

== Argonne National Laboratory ==
As a postdoctoral fellow at Argonne, Dr. Thurnauer worked with James R. Norris (chemist) and Joseph J. Katz. She used EPR spectroscopy to study photochemical energy conversion in the natural photosynthesis system. She was promoted to a staff position as an Assistant Chemist, and for several years was the only female staff scientist in the chemistry division. From 1993 to 1995 she was the Group Leader for the Photochemical Energy Sciences Group. From 1995 to 2003, she served as the first woman director of CHM, and the first woman division director within Argonne’s Physical Sciences Directorate. In 2003 she was recognized as an Argonne Distinguished Fellow. She is currently Argonne Distinguished Fellow Emeritus from the Chemical Sciences and Engineering Division. During her career she authored or coauthored more than 135 publications and was awarded 4 US patents. She has actively encouraged other women scientists.

Dr. Thurnauers studies focused on the fundamental mechanisms of photophysics and photochemistry and their applications to the design of artificial photocatalytic systems. A major area of her research was solar photochemical energy conversion in bacterial and oxygenic photosynthesis and model photosynthetic systems. Oxygenic photosynthesis is the main process providing energy to the biosphere of the planet, creating the protective ozone layer and consuming carbon dioxide. Photosynthetic organisms use solar energy, converting it into high-energy biochemical compounds. With her colleagues, she modeled the spin and polarization of electrons in light-activated photosynthetic systems and helped to develop time-resolved magnetic resonance techniques for the study of sequential electron transfer in photochemical energy conversion. With her collaborators, she extended her concepts to bio-inspired nanomaterials that mimic the energy transduction of natural photosynthetic systems. She is a co-editor of "The Purple Photosynthetic Bacteria" (2008), a collection of authoritative reviews on bacterial photosynthesis.

== Women in Science and Technology ==
Dr. Thurnauer was awarded the Argonne Director’s Award for Extraordinary Effort in 1990 for her work in establishing the "Science Careers in Search of Women" conference, an extremely successful program that enables students to learn about technical careers in science and engineering and meet with women working actively in science. The first year involved college women, but in ensuing years the program has worked with high school students.

After the second conference, Argonne leadership and women scientists launched the Argonne Women in Science and Technology (WIST) program. Thurnauer and others emphasized that outreach and internal career development were closely linked, promoting change within the organization as well as without: "Young women could not be brought to Argonne and successfully encouraged to be scientists and engineers if they observed only a few women in relatively lower level positions." Thurnauer served a two-year term (1992-1994) as the Women in Science Program Initiator, a paid 30% appointment, and for several years was a member of the WIST Steering Committee.

== Awards ==
- NATO Grant for International Collaborative Research with Professor K. Mobius and Dr. R. Furrer, Freie Universität Berlin, Berlin, West Germany, 1984
- Argonne National Laboratory Pacesetter Award for Outstanding Contribution to the Organization of the Conference, "Science Careers in Search of Women", 1989
- ANL Director's Award for Extraordinary Effort involved in Organizing “Science Careers in Search of Women” Conference, 1990
- Award of Merit of Chicago Association of Technological Societies, 1990
- University of Chicago Award for Distinguished Performance at Argonne, 1991
- YWCA Outstanding Women Leaders of DuPage County Award, 1996
- Fellow of the American Association for the Advancement of Science, 1997
- Agnes Fay Morgan Research Award by Iota Sigma Pi, National Honor Society for Women in Chemistry, 1997
- Francis P. Garvan-John M. Olin Medal Award, National American Chemical Society, 2002
- Science Careers in Search of Women Conference, Founders Award, 2007
- University of Chicago - Argonne Pinnacle of Education Award, 2007, for "leadership in science through the Division of Educational Programs."
- Council for Chemical Research Diversity Award, 2010
