= Frank Mayo =

Frank Mayo may refer to:

- Frank Mayo (stage actor) (1839–1896)
- Frank Mayo (film actor) (1889–1963)
- Frank R. Mayo (1908–1987), American chemist
