= Giancarlo Fortino =

Italian computer scientist

- Education: University of Calabria
- Known for: IoT-enabled Wearable Computing Systems
- Awards: Fellow. IEEE. 2021; Andrew P. Sage Best IEEE SMC Transactions Paper Award. IEEE SMC. 2014
- Scientific career
- Fields: Computer Science
- Workplaces: University of Calabria
- Website: https://labs.dimes.unical.it/speme/people/giancarlo-fortino/

Giancarlo Fortino is an Italian computer scientist who is currently a full professor of computer engineering at the Department of Informatics, Modeling, Electronics and Systems (DIMES) of the University of Calabria.

== Education ==
Giancarlo Fortino was born in Italy in 1971. He graduated from University of Calabria in 1995 with a laurea (5-year master's degree) in computer engineering. In 2000, he received a PhD in computer engineering from the University of Calabria.

== Career ==
Giancarlo Fortino is currently a full-time professor of computer engineering at the Department of Informatics, Modeling, Electronics and Systems (DIMES) of the University of Calabria, where he is the director of the SPEME (Smart, Pervasive and Mobile systems Engineering) lab. He has supervised or co-supervised more than 15 doctoral students.

In 1997 and 1999, he was a research scholar at the International Computer Science Institute in Berkeley, US. In 2009, he was a visiting professor at Queensland University of Technology, Australia. In 2001–2006, he was an assistant professor and in 2006–2018 he was an associate professor at the University of Calabria. In 2012, he was nominated Guest Professor of Computer Engineering at the Wuhan University of Technology. In 2015, he was nominated adjunct full professor of computer engineering in the framework of High-End Foreign Experts in China. Since 2015, he has been an adjunct senior research fellow at the Institute of High-Performance Computing and Networks of the National Research Council (Italy). In 2017, he was nominated high-end expert at Huazhong University of Science and Technology, China. In 2019, he served as a visiting scientist at Shenzhen Institute of Information Technology after being awarded a Chinese Academy of Sciences President's International Fellowship Initiative (PIFI). In the same year, he was also nominated distinguished professor at Huazhong Agricultural University, China.

== Editorial Activities ==
Giancarlo Fortino is the founding editor of the IEEE Press Book Series on "Human-Machine Systems". He is the founding editor-in-chief of Springer Book Series on “Internet of Things: Technology, Communications and Computing”. He currently serves in the editorial board of several IEEE journals, including IEEE Sensors Journal and IEEE Access. He has edited several books, including one published by Wiley-IEEE Press and entitled "Wearable Computing: From Modeling to Implementation of Wearable Systems based on Body Sensor Networks".

== Publications ==
He has published more than 500 articles in international conferences, journals, and book chapters. He is listed among the Clarivate Web of Science Highly Cited researchers in the field of Computer Science. He is the only Italian highly cited researcher in the computer science area.

== Honors and awards ==
He is an Institute of Electrical and Electronics Engineers (IEEE) fellow. He is also a fellow of the Asia-Pacific Artificial Intelligence Association. He has been the recipient of three best paper awards, including the 2014 Andrew P. Sage Best IEEE SMC Transactions Paper Award, and of an Outstanding Chapter Award as the Chair of the IEEE SMC Italy Chapter. He held more than 100 invited talks, keynotes, tutorials, and panels, at international conferences and symposia, and he is a Distinguished Lecturer of the IEEE Sensors Council.
