= Srinivas Tadigadapa =

Srinivas Tadigadapa is a professor and chair of the Department of Electrical and Computer Engineering at Northeastern University in Boston, Massachusetts. From 2000 to 2017 he was a professor of electrical engineering at Penn State University. Prior to that, he was the vice president of manufacturing at Integrated Sensing Systems Inc., and was involved with the design, fabrication, packaging, reliability, and manufacturing of micromachined silicon pressure and Coriolis flow sensors.

Tadigadapa's primary research interest is in the interdisciplinary field of microelectromechanical systems (MEMS) and in the design, optimization, fabrication, and testing of MEMS transducers. Specifically, his research focuses are on fabrication of novel micro and nanosensors and actuators by integrating non-traditional materials using silicon microfabrication techniques and exploring phenomena in micro-nano interfaces.

Tadigadapa has published over 180 peer reviewed papers in the field of MEMS, and holds ten patents. He has been a research fellow at the University of Karlsruhe, Germany, and a visiting professor at Otto von Guericke University in Magdeburg, Germany and University College, Cork, Ireland. He was awarded the Alexander von Humboldt fellowship in Germany, and the Walton fellowship by the Science Foundation of Ireland.

Tadigadapa is a Fellow of the IEEE and the Institute of Physics, London, and a Life-Fellow of the Cambridge Philosophical Society. He was the Chair of the Technical Program Committee for IEEE SENSORS at its 2015 – 2017 conferences, and the founding editor of IEEE Sensors Letters. Professor Tadigadapa was named a Fellow of the Institute of Electrical and Electronics Engineers (IEEE) in 2014 for his contributions to microelectromechanical systems for fluidic and biochemical sensors. In 2016, Dr. Tadigadapa was selected for the William Mong Distinguished Lecture in Engineering by the University of Hong Kong. In 2020, he was awarded the Meritorious Service Award by the IEEE Sensors Council.. He is now the President Elect of the IEEE Sensors Council.
