= Mayo–Lewis equation =

Equation in polymer chemistry

The Mayo–Lewis equation or copolymer equation in polymer chemistry describes the distribution of monomers in a copolymer. It was proposed by Frank R. Mayo and Frederick M. Lewis.

The equation considers a monomer mix of two components $M_1\,$ and $M_2\,$ and the four different reactions that can take place at the reactive chain end terminating in either monomer ($M_1^*\,$ and $M_2^*\,$) with their reaction rate constants $k\,$:

$$M_1^* + M_1 \xrightarrow{k_{11}} M_1M_1^* \,$$
$$M_1^* + M_2 \xrightarrow{k_{12}} M_1M_2^* \,$$
$$M_2^* + M_2 \xrightarrow{k_{22}} M_2M_2^* \,$$
$$M_2^* + M_1 \xrightarrow{k_{21}} M_2M_1^* \,$$

The reactivity ratio for each propagating chain end is defined as the ratio of the rate constant for addition of a monomer of the species already at the chain end to the rate constant for addition of the other monomer.

$$r_1 = \frac{k_{11}}{k_{12}} \,$$
$$r_2 = \frac{k_{22}}{k_{21}} \,$$

The copolymer equation is then:

$$\frac {d\left [M_1 \right]}{d\left [M_2\right]}=\frac{\left [M_1\right]\left (r_1\left[M_1\right]+\left [M_2\right]\right)}{\left [M_2\right]\left (\left [M_1\right]+r_2\left [M_2\right]\right)}$$

with the concentrations of the components in square brackets. The equation gives the relative instantaneous rates of incorporation of the two monomers.

== Equation derivation ==
Monomer 1 is consumed with reaction rate:

$\frac{-d[M_1]}{dt} = k_{11}[M_1]\sum[M_1^*] + k_{21}[M_1]\sum[M_2^*] \,$

with $\sum[M_1^*]$ the concentration of all the active chains terminating in monomer 1, summed over chain lengths. $\sum[M_2^*]$ is defined similarly for monomer 2.

Likewise the rate of disappearance for monomer 2 is:

$\frac{-d[M_2]}{dt} = k_{12}[M_2]\sum[M_1^*] + k_{22}[M_2]\sum[M_2^*] \,$

Division of both equations by $\sum[M_2^*] \,$ followed by division of the first equation by the second yields:

$\frac{d[M_1]}{d[M_2]} = \frac{[M_1]}{[M_2]} \left( \frac{k_{11}\frac{\sum[M_1^*]}{\sum[M_2^*]} + k_{21}} {k_{12}\frac{\sum[M_1^*]}{\sum[M_2^*]} + k_{22}} \right) \,$

The ratio of active center concentrations can be found using the steady state approximation, meaning that the concentration of each type of active center remains constant.

$\frac{d\sum[M_1^*]}{dt} = \frac{d\sum[M_2^*]}{dt} \approx 0\,$

The rate of formation of active centers of monomer 1 ($M_2^* + M_1 \xrightarrow{k_{21}} M_2M_1^* \,$) is equal to the rate of their destruction ($M_1^* + M_2 \xrightarrow{k_{12}} M_1M_2^* \,$) so that

$k_{21}[M_1]\sum[M_2^*] = k_{12}[M_2]\sum[M_1^*] \,$

or

$\frac{\sum[M_1^*]}{\sum[M_2^*]} = \frac{k_{21}[M_1]}{k_{12}[M_2]}\,$

Substituting into the ratio of monomer consumption rates yields the Mayo–Lewis equation after rearrangement:

$\frac{d[M_1]}{d[M_2]} = \frac{[M_1]}{[M_2]} \left( \frac{k_{11}\frac{k_{21}[M_1]}{k_{12}[M_2]} + k_{21}} {k_{12}\frac{k_{21}[M_1]}{k_{12}[M_2]}+ k_{22}} \right) = \frac{[M_1]}{[M_2]} \left( \frac{\frac{k_{11}[M_1]}{k_{12}[M_2]} + 1} {\frac{[M_1]}{[M_2]}+ \frac{k_{22}}{k_{21}}} \right) = \frac{[M_1]}{[M_2]} \frac{\left (r_1\left[M_1\right]+\left [M_2\right]\right)}{\left (\left [M_1\right]+r_2\left [M_2\right]\right)}$

== Mole fraction form ==
It is often useful to alter the copolymer equation by expressing concentrations in terms of mole fractions. Mole fractions of monomers $M_1\,$ and $M_2\,$ in the feed are defined as $f_1\,$ and $f_2\,$ where

$f_1 = 1 - f_2 = \frac{M_1}{(M_1 + M_2)} \,$

Similarly, $F\,$ represents the mole fraction of each monomer in the copolymer:

$F_1 = 1 - F_2 = \frac{d M_1}{d (M_1 + M_2)} \,$

These equations can be combined with the Mayo–Lewis equation to give

$F_1=1-F_2=\frac{r_1 f_1^2+f_1 f_2}{r_1 f_1^2+2f_1 f_2+r_2f_2^2}\,$

This equation gives the composition of copolymer formed at each instant. However the feed and copolymer compositions can change as polymerization proceeds.

== Limiting cases ==
Reactivity ratios indicate preference for propagation. Large $r_1\,$ indicates a tendency for $M_1^*\,$ to add $M_1\,$, while small $r_1\,$ corresponds to a tendency for $M_1^*\,$ to add $M_2\,$. Values of $r_2\,$ describe the tendency of $M_2^*\,$ to add $M_2\,$ or $M_1\,$. From the definition of reactivity ratios, several special cases can be derived:

- $r_1 \approx r_2 >> 1 \,$ If both reactivity ratios are very high, the two monomers only react with themselves and not with each other. This leads to a mixture of two homopolymers.
- $r_1 \approx r_2 > 1 \,$. If both ratios are larger than 1, homopolymerization of each monomer is favored. However, in the event of crosspolymerization adding the other monomer, the chain-end will continue to add the new monomer and form a block copolymer.
- $r_1 \approx r_2 \approx 1 \,$. If both ratios are near 1, a given monomer will add the two monomers with comparable speeds and a statistical or random copolymer is formed.
- $r_1 \approx r_2 \approx 0 \,$ If both values are near 0, the monomers are unable to homopolymerize. Each can add only the other resulting in an alternating polymer. For example, the copolymerization of maleic anhydride and styrene has reactivity ratios $r_1\,$ = 0.01 for maleic anhydride and $r_2$ = 0.02 for styrene. Maleic acid in fact does not homopolymerize in free radical polymerization, but will form an almost exclusively alternating copolymer with styrene.
- $r_1 >> 1 >> r_2 \,$ In the initial stage of the copolymerization, monomer 1 is incorporated faster and the copolymer is rich in monomer 1. When this monomer gets depleted, more monomer 2 segments are added. This is called composition drift.
- When both $r < 1 \,$, the system has an azeotrope, where feed and copolymer composition are the same.

== Calculation of reactivity ratios ==
Calculation of reactivity ratios generally involves carrying out several polymerizations at varying monomer ratios. The copolymer composition can be analysed with methods such as Proton nuclear magnetic resonance, Carbon-13 nuclear magnetic resonance, or Fourier transform infrared spectroscopy. The polymerizations are also carried out at low conversions, so monomer concentrations can be assumed to be constant. With all the other parameters in the copolymer equation known, $r_1\,$ and $r_2\,$ can be found.

=== Curve Fitting ===
One of the simplest methods for finding reactivity ratios is plotting the copolymer equation and using nonlinear least squares analysis to find the $r_1\,$, $r_2\,$ pair that gives the best fit curve. This is preferred as methods such as Kelen-Tüdős or Fineman-Ross (see below) that involve linearization of the Mayo–Lewis equation will introduce bias to the results.

=== Mayo-Lewis Method ===
The Mayo-Lewis method uses a form of the copolymer equation relating $r_1\,$ to $r_2\,$:

$r_2 = \frac{f_1}{f_2}\left[\frac{F_2}{F_1}(1+\frac{f_1r_1}{f_2})-1\right]\,$

For each different monomer composition, a line is generated using arbitrary $r_1\,$ values. The intersection of these lines is the $r_1\,$, $r_2\,$ for the system. More frequently, the lines do not intersect in a single point and the area in which most lines intersect can be given as a range of $r_1\,$, and $r_2\,$ values.

=== Fineman-Ross Method ===
Fineman and Ross rearranged the copolymer equation into a linear form:

$G= Hr_1-r_2 \,$

where $G = \frac{f_1(2F_1-1)}{(1-f_1)F_1} \,$ and $H = \frac{f_1^2(1-F_1)}{(1-f_1)^2F_1}\$

Thus, a plot of $H \,$ versus $G \,$ yields a straight line with slope $r_1\,$ and intercept $-r_2\,$

=== Kelen-Tüdős method ===
The Fineman-Ross method can be biased towards points at low or high monomer concentration, so Kelen and Tüdős introduced an arbitrary constant,

$\alpha = (H_{min}H_{max})^{0.5} \,$

where $H_{min} \,$ and $H_{max} \,$ are the highest and lowest values of $H \,$ from the Fineman-Ross method. The data can be plotted in a linear form

$\eta = \left[r_1+\frac{r_2}{\alpha}\right]\mu - \frac{r_2}{\alpha} \,$

where $\eta= G/(\alpha+H) \,$ and $\mu= H/(\alpha+H) \,$. Plotting $\eta$ against $\mu$ yields a straight line that gives $-r_2/\alpha$ when $\mu=0$ and $r_1$ when $\mu = 1$. This distributes the data more symmetrically and can yield better results.

=== Q-e scheme ===
A semi-empirical method for the prediction of reactivity ratios is called the Q-e scheme which was proposed by Alfrey and Price in 1947. This involves using two parameters for each monomer, $Q$ and $e$. The reaction of $M_1$ radical with $M_2$ monomer is written as

$k_{12} = P_1Q_2exp(-e_1e_2)$

while the reaction of $M_1$ radical with $M_1$ monomer is written as

$k_{11} = P_1Q_1exp(-e_1e_1)$

Where P is a proportionality constant, Q is the measure of reactivity of monomer via resonance stabilization, and e is the measure of polarity of monomer (molecule or radical) via the effect of functional groups on vinyl groups. Using these definitions, $r_1$ and $r_2$ can be found by the ratio of the terms. An advantage of this system is that reactivity ratios can be found using tabulated Q-e values of monomers regardless of what the monomer pair is in the system.
