= Michael Shur =

American physicist (1942–2026)

Michael Shur (November 13, 1942 – June 5, 2026) was a Russian and American physicist and academic who was a professor of solid state electronics and electrical engineering at Rensselaer Polytechnic Institute.

== Background ==
Shur was born on November 13, 1942, in Kamensk-Uralsky, Sverdlovsk Oblast, Russian SFSR, USSR. He received his master's degree in Electrical Engineering from St. Petersburg Electrotechnical Institute. In 1967 he received his Ph.D. in physics from the A.F. Ioffe Institute in Petersburg, Russia. In 1993, he received Dr. Sc. degree from A.F. Ioffe Institute.

He held research or faculty positions at the A.F. Ioffe Institute, Wayne State University, Oakland University, Cornell University, IBM T.J. Watson Research Center, and the University of Minnesota. From 1989 to 1996, he was the John Money Professor at the University of Virginia, where he served as the director of the Applied Electrophysics Laboratories in 1996. He moved to Rensselaer Polytechnic Institute in 1996.

Shur died on June 5, 2026, at the age of 83.

== Research ==
Shur led many research efforts in diverse fields related to semiconductor devices, solid-state physics, and engineering, such as plasma wave electronics, thin film transistors, laser technology, sub-micrometer field effect transistors, terahertz technology, Surface Acoustic, and Acousto-Optic devices. Having written over 1,000 technical publications, the Institute for Scientific Information, an organization that tracks citations, lists him as one of the most quoted researchers in his field. He also authored, co-authored, or served as editor for 32 books. As of 2022, he held over 375 patents for a wide variety of microelectronic innovations.

== Awards and honors ==
- in 1994 Honorary Doctorate from St. Petersburg State Technical University
- in 2007 the IEEE Donald G. Fink Prize Paper Award for the paper "Solid-State Lighting: Towards Superior Illumination"
- in 2007 the IEEE Leon K. Kirchmayer Graduate Teaching Award for "inspirational guidance of graduate students & development of novel teaching materials in solid-state electronics"
- in 2008 IEEE Sensors Council Technical Achievement Award
- in 2009 elected Foreign Member of the Lithuanian Academy of Sciences
- in 2018 IEEE Ebers Award
- in 2015 Institute of Electronic Technology Medal
- in 2016, Fellow, US National Academy of Inventors
- in 2016 Honorary Doctorate University of Vilnius
