= Joseph J. Katz =

- Born: April 19, 1912; Detroit, Michigan
- Died: January 28, 2008 (aged 95); Chicago, Illinois
- Education: University of Chicago
- Awards: 1992 Rumford Prize
- Scientific career
- Workplaces: Argonne National Laboratory
- Doctoral advisor: Frank R. Mayo
- Notable students: Michael R. Wasielewski, Marion C. Thurnauer

Joseph J. Katz (April 19, 1912, Detroit – January 28, 2008, Chicago) was a chemist at Argonne National Laboratory whose fundamental research on the chemistry of photosynthesis led to his election to the US National Academy of Sciences. His parents were Jewish immigrants from Czarist Russia. Neither parent had any formal education.

== Education and independent research ==
His college education was in chemistry at the College of the City of Detroit (now Wayne State University). He worked for seven years at small companies in Detroit, developing adhesives, metal polishing compounds, lubricants and other specialty chemical formulations used in the automobile industry. While working in Detroit after receiving his bachelor's degree, Katz and several colleagues rented a room in a Detroit office building and used it as a laboratory. They carried out independent research from 1932 through 1939, trying to cure tuberculosis by finding a substance that could dissolve the fatty outer coating of the TB bacillus so that it would be vulnerable to being destroyed by a drug. He and a Detroit colleague published two papers on studies with the bacterium Mycobacterium smegmatis, a fast-growing and non-pathogenic bacillus with similar physical properties to the tuberculosis bacillus.

Unemployed in summer 1939, he followed a suggestion from a former teacher and applied for graduate school in chemistry at the University of Chicago. His thesis research in physical organic chemistry under the supervision of Frank R. Mayo was a study of the mechanism of addition of hydrogen chloride to isobutene in a solvent of low dielectric constant. He received a PhD degree in March 1942.

== Major publications ==
- G. T. Seaborg, J. J. Katz, and W. M. Manning, (eds.) (1949) The Transuranium Elements: Research Papers, Natl. Nucl. En. Ser., Div. IV, 14B, McGraw‐Hill, New York.
- Joseph J. Katz and Eugene Rabinowitch, (1951) The Chemistry of Uranium, McGraw-Hill, New York. (Reprinted 1961 by Dover Publications, New York.)
- Glenn T. Seaborg and Joseph J. Katz (eds.), The Actinide Elements (McGraw-Hill, New York, 1954).
- Joseph J. Katz and Glenn T. Seaborg, The Chemistry of the Actinide Elements, Methuen, London and New York, 1957.
- Joseph J. Katz and Eugene Rabinowitch (eds.), (1958) Chemistry of Uranium, Collected Papers, 2 vols. U.S. Atomic Energy Commission, Technical Information Service, Oak Ridge, TN, TID-5290.
- J. R. Norris, R. A. Uphaus, H. L. Crespi and J J Katz (1971), Electron spin resonance of chlorophyll and the origin of Signal I in photosynthesis. Proc. Natl. Acad. Sci. USA 68: 625-628
- M. C. Thurnauer, J. J. Katz, and J. R. Norris, Triplet-State In Bacterial Photosynthesis - Possible Mechanisms Of Primary Photo-Act, Proc. Natl. Acad. Sci. USA, 72, 3270–3274, 1975.
- L. L. Shipman, T. M. Cotton, J. R. Norris, and J. J. Katz, New Proposal for Structure of Special-Pair Chlorophyll, Proc. Natl. Acad. Sci. USA, 73, 1791–1794, 1976.
- Shipman, Lester L.; Cotton, Therese M.; Norris, James R.; Katz, Joseph J. (December 1976). "An analysis of the visible absorption spectrum of chlorophyll a monomer, dimer, and oligomers in solution". Journal of the American Chemical Society. 98 (25): 8222–8230. doi:10.1021/ja00441a056. PMID 993521.
- J. J. Katz, J. R. Norris, L. L. Shipman, M. C. Thurnauer, and M. R. Wasielewski, Chlorophyll Function In Photosynthetic Reaction Center, Annual Review of Biophysics and Bioengineering, Vol, 7, 393–434, 1978.
- Joseph J. Katz, Glenn T. Seaborg, and Lester R. Morss (eds.), The Chemistry of the Actinide Elements, 2nd ed., Chapman & Hall, 1986.
