= Composition drift =

Composition drift occurs during the process of free radical copolymerization causing variation in the instantaneous mole fraction of a monomer added to a copolymer, therefore altering the chemical composition of the copolymer over the period of conversion.

The degree of composition drift is directly affected by the reactivity ratios of each monomer in the copolymer system. Both the Mayo-Lewis equation and plot of the equation make evident that as monomer conversion increases, the copolymer composition will drift as the preferences for monomers change due to the interaction between reactivity ratios and the instantaneous concentration of each monomer.

Composition drift in some degree will occur unless the reactivity ratios for both monomers are equal to 1. In this case, each monomer prefers reaction with itself and the other monomer equally. This causes equal rates of consumption for copolymer formation and leads to random copolymerization.

== Mole fractions ==
$F_1 =$ the mole fraction of monomer added instantaneously to copolymer that is a monomer 1.

$f_1 =$ the instantaneous mole fraction of monomer mix that is monomer 1.

=== Azeotropic Compositions ===
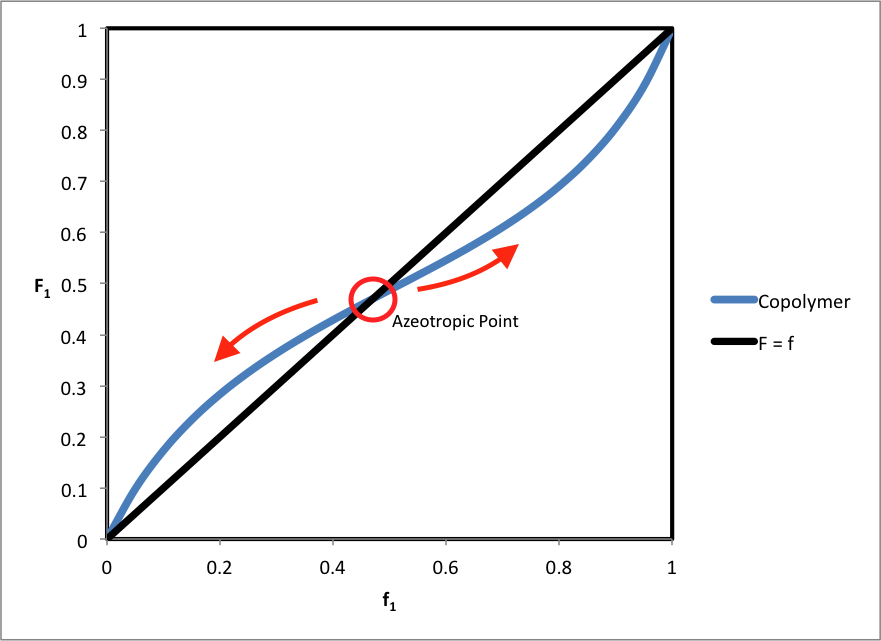
Azeotropic point and corresponding composition drift associated with this unstable critical point.

Binary copolymerization resembles distillation of a bicomponent liquid mixture with reactivity ratios corresponding to the ratio of vapor pressures of the pure components in the latter case. Distillation terminology is also borrowed for the case of azeotropic compositions in copolymer systems. Azeotropic points occur where $F_1$ is equal to $f_1$. At these points, composition drift will not occur. The equation for the azeotropic concentration is shown below at the given reactivity ratios for each monomer species:

$(f_1)_a = \frac{1-r_2}{2-r_1-r_2}\,$

The azeotropic concentrations are unstable operation points, as any small change in temperature will cause a shift in molar concentration through reactivity ratio effects and cause subsequent composition drift. Azeotropic points occur when the feed monomers have reactivity ratios that are both less than 1 or both greater than 1.

== Control or elimination of composition drift ==
The goal of engineering for free radical copolymerization is to have $F_1 = f_1$ over a broad range of conversion. For commercial applications, copolymer composition must be consistent across the aggregate. Batch reactors have no control over composition drift and require the implementation of engineering solutions to limit drift. Some possible reactor engineering solutions include:

1. Semibatch reactor or fed-batch reactor: by adding the monomer that is preferentially consumed at the reaction rate, $f_1$ can be held constant and maintained.
2. Continuous stirred tank reactor (CSTR): at steady state the reactor composition ($f_1$) is constant and will not allow for composition drift. These reactors can have the issue of multiple steady states if the reaction within the CSTR is an exothermic process.

== See also ==
- Radical polymerization
- Azeotropic distillation

== Additional sources ==
- Cowie, J.M.G.; Arrighi, Valeria (2007-07-27). Polymers: Chemistry and Physics of Modern Materials, Third Edition. CRC Press. pp. 122–. ISBN 9781420009873.
