= Kourosh Kalantar-zadeh =

Materials scientist

Kourosh Kalantar-zadeh FRSN
- Occupations: Professor and former Head of School of Chemical and Biomolecular Engineering, University of Sydney, Australia
- Relatives: Kamyar Kalantar-Zadeh (brother)

Kourosh Kalantar-zadeh FRSN (born in November 1971) is an Australian scientist involved in research in the fields of materials sciences, electronics, and transducers. He is best known for his works on two-dimensional semiconductors, ingestible sensors and liquid metals. He led his group to the invention of an ingestible chemical sensor: human gas sensing capsule.

== Career ==
Kourosh Kalantar-zadeh is a Professor of Engineering at the University of Sydney. Previously, he served as the Head of School of Chemical and Biomolecular Engineering, at the University of Sydney, Australia. He is a 2018 Australian Research Council (ARC) Laureate Fellow and an adjunct professor of engineering at UNSW, in Sydney. Formerly, he was a Distinguished Professor of Electronic Engineering at RMIT in Melbourne. Kourosh Kalantar-zadeh was also the Director of the Centre for Advanced Solid and Liquid based Electronics and Optics (CASLEO) at UNSW.

Kalantar-zadeh has coauthored over 500 highly cited research articles and reviews. In addition, he is a member of the editorial boards or advisory boards of Applied Materials Today, ACS Sensors, Advanced Materials Technologies, Nanoscale (journal), Applied Surface Science and ACS Nano. Kalantar-zadeh is an Associate Editor for ACS Applied Nano Materials. He was also a Chief Investigator within the ARC Centre of Excellence in Future Low-Energy Electronics Technologies (FLEET) developing nanofabrication methods and 2D/novel materials for future electronics.

== Awards and recognitions ==
Kourosh Kalantar-zadeh has received many national and international awards for the recognition of his work on sensors and liquid metals. A selected few are listed as follows:

- 2026 Fellow of the Institute of Electrical and Electronics Engineers
- 2025 Fellow of the Australian Academy of Technology and Engineering
- 2025 Foreign Fellow of the European Academy of Sciences and Arts
- 2025 Fellow of the Engineers Australia
- 2023 Fellow of the Royal Australian Chemical Institute
- 2021 Fellow of the American Association for the Advancement of Science
- 2021 Clarivate Highly Cited Researchers list
- 2020 Fellow of the Royal Society of New South Wales
- 2020 Robert Boyle Prize for Analytical Science, Royal Society of Chemistry (RSC), UK
- 2020 Clarivate Highly Cited Researchers list
- 2019 Walter Burfitt Prize from the Royal Society of New South Wales
- 2019 LinkedIn Spotlight for Australia
- 2019 Clarivate Highly Cited Researchers list
- 2018 American Chemical Society (ACS) Advances in Measurement Science Lectureship Award (Asia-Pacific region)
- 2018 Clarivate Highly Cited Researchers list
- 2018 Australian Research Council (ARC) Laureate Fellow
- 2017 IEEE Sensors Council Technical Achievement Award
