= Andrei Shkel =

Andrei M. Shkel
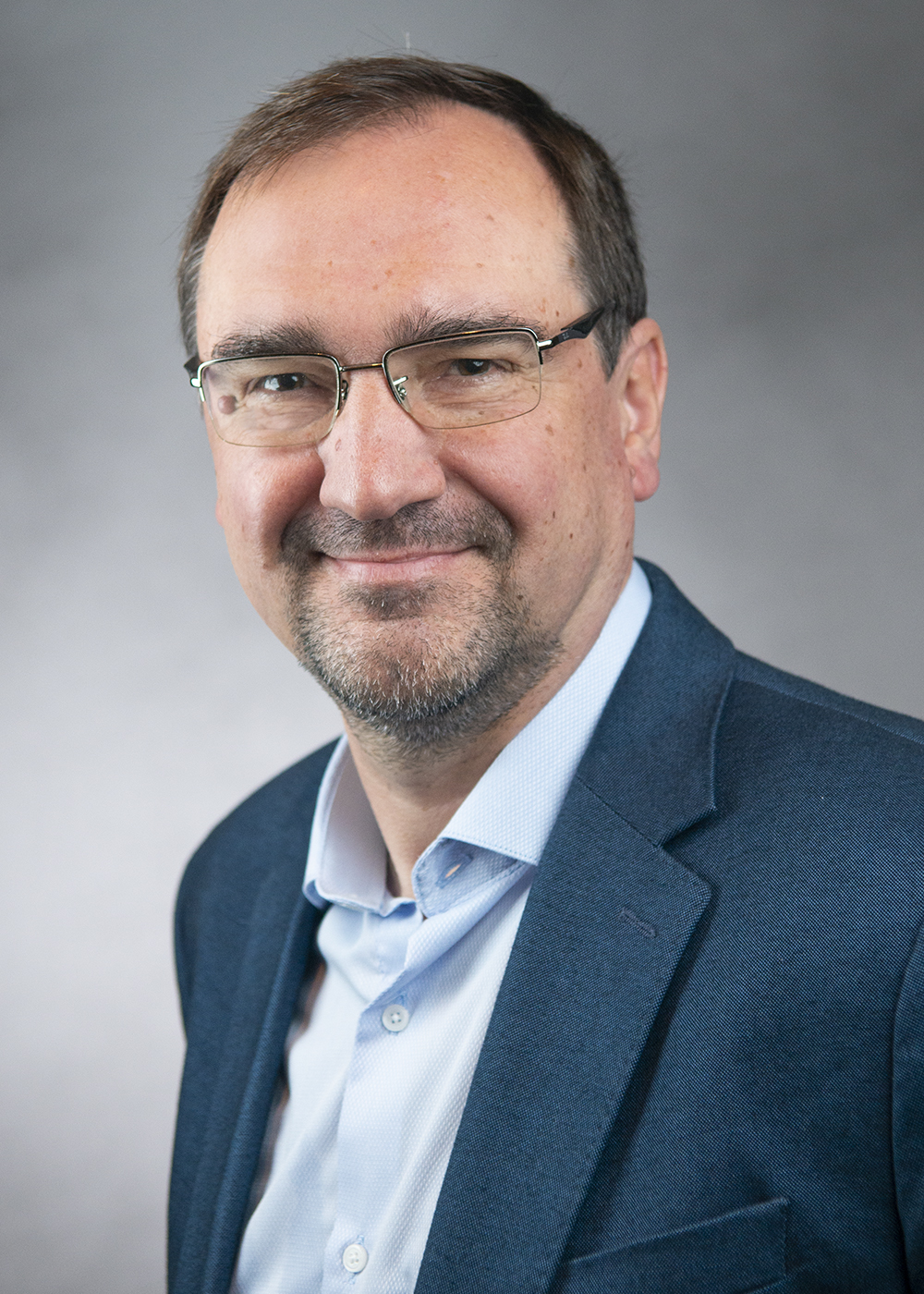
- Born: 1967 (age 58–59)
- Education: Lomonosov's Moscow State University, University of Wisconsin - Madison (Ph.D.)
- Known for: Coriolis Vibratory Gyroscopes; MEMS; Fabrication Technology
- Awards: National Academy of Inventors fellow
- Scientific career
- Fields: Mechanical Engineering, Aerospace Engineering, Applied Mechanics and Mathematics
- Institutions: University of California Irvine, University of California Berkeley, Defense Advanced Research Projects Agency (DARPA)
- Website: mems.eng.uci.edu

Andrei M. Shkel (born 1967 in Russia) is a Chancellor’s Professor of Mechanical and Aerospace Engineering at the University of California, Irvine. He was named Fellow of the Institute of Electrical and Electronics Engineers (IEEE) in 2014 "for contributions to micromachined gyroscopes". He served as the President of the IEEE Sensors Council (2020-2021). In 2021, he was elected to National Academy of Inventors (NAI) Fellow status. As of June 2025, he is the Editor-in-Chief of the IEEE Sensors Letterss and the Series Editor for The Wiley - IEEE Press Series on Sensors Technology.

== Education and career ==
Shkel was educated at the Moscow State University where in 1991 he got his diploma in applied mechanics. In 1997, he earned his Ph.D. in mechanical engineering from the University of Wisconsin–Madison and from 1997 to 1999 served as a postdoc at the University of California, Berkeley. Since 2000, Shkel is a faculty member at the University of California, Irvine, and from 2009 to 2013, he was on leave from academia serving as a Program Manager in the Microsystems Technology Office of the Defense Advanced Research Projects Agency (DARPA). Dr. Shkel has been on a number of editorial boards, most recently as Editor of IEEE/ASME Journal of Micro-Electro-Mechanical Systems (JMEMS), Editor of the Journal on Gyroscopy and Navigation, member of the program committee of the DGON / IEEE ISA Inertial Sensors & Applications conference, and the founding chair of the IEEE International Symposium on Inertial Sensors and Systems (INERTIAL). Dr. Shkel has been also awarded in 2013 the Office of the Secretary of Defense Medal for Exceptional Public Service, the 2009 IEEE Sensors Council Technical Achievement Award, the 2023 IEEE Sensors Council John Vig Meritorious Service Award, and the 2005 NSF CAREER award. His professional interests, reflected in over 300 publications, three books, and 43 U.S. Patents, include high performance inertial sensors, microelectromechanical systems (MEMS), and implantable vestibular prosthetics. His book has been selected as the recipient of the 2024 Wiley-IEEE Press Professional Book Award.
