= Nanomotor =

Molecular device capable of converting energy into movement

A nanomotor is a molecular or nanoscale device capable of converting energy into movement. It can typically generate forces on the order of piconewtons.

Magnetically controlled Helical Nanomotor moving inside a HeLa cell drawing a pattern 'N'.

While nanoparticles have been utilized by artists for centuries, such as in the famous Lycurgus cup, scientific research into nanotechnology did not come about until recently. In 1959, Richard Feynman gave a famous talk entitled "There's Plenty of Room at the Bottom" at the American Physical Society's conference hosted at Caltech. He went on to wage a scientific bet that no one person could design a motor smaller than 400 μm on any side. The purpose of the bet (as with most scientific bets) was to inspire scientists to develop new technologies, and anyone who could develop a nanomotor could claim the $1,000 USD prize. However, his purpose was thwarted by William McLellan, who fabricated a nanomotor without developing new methods. Nonetheless, Richard Feynman's speech inspired a new generation of scientists to pursue research into nanotechnology.

Nanomotors are the focus of research for their ability to overcome microfluidic dynamics present at low Reynold's numbers. Scallop Theory explains that nanomotors must break symmetry to produce motion at low Reynold's numbers. In addition, Brownian motion must be considered because particle-solvent interaction can dramatically impact the ability of a nanomotor to traverse through a liquid. This can pose a significant problem when designing new nanomotors. Current nanomotor research seeks to overcome these problems, and by doing so, can improve current microfluidic devices or give rise to new technologies.

Research has been done to overcome microfluidic dynamics at low Reynolds number. The more pressing challenge is to overcome issues such as biocompatibility, control on directionality and availability of fuel before nanomotors can be used in a wider range of applications such as environmental remediation or sensing, and for theranostic applications within the body.

== Nanotube and nanowire motors ==
In 2004, Ayusman Sen and Thomas E. Mallouk fabricated the first synthetic and autonomous nanomotor. The two-micron long nanomotors were composed of two segments, platinum and gold, that could catalytically react with diluted hydrogen peroxide in water to produce motion. The Au-Pt nanomotors use autonomous, non-Brownian motion that stems from the propulsion via catalytic generation of chemical gradients. Their motion does not require the presence of an external magnetic, electric or optical field to guide their motion. By creating their own local fields, these motors move through self-electrophoresis. Joseph Wang in 2008 was able to enhance the motion of Au-Pt catalytic nanomotors by incorporating carbon nanotubes into the platinum segment.

Different types of nanotube and nanowire based motors have been developed, in addition to nano- and micromotors of different shapes. Most of these motors use hydrogen peroxide as fuel, but some notable exceptions exist.

Metallic microrods (4.3 μm long x 300 nm diameter) can be propelled autonomously in fluids or inside living cells, without chemical fuel, by resonant ultrasound. These rods contain a central Ni stripe that can be steered by an external magnetic field, resulting in "synchronized swimming."

These silver halide and silver-platinum nanomotors are powered by halide fuels, which can be regenerated by exposure to ambient light. Some nanomotors can even be propelled by multiple stimuli, with varying responses. These multi-functional nanowires move in different directions depending on the stimulus (e.g. chemical fuel or ultrasonic power) applied. For example, bimetallic nanomotors have been shown to undergo rheotaxis to move with or against fluid flow by a combination of chemical and acoustic stimuli. In Dresden Germany, rolled-up microtube nanomotors produced motion by harnessing the bubbles in catalytic reactions. Without the reliance on electrostatic interactions, bubble-induced propulsion enables motor movement in relevant biological fluids, but typically still requires toxic fuels such as hydrogen peroxide. This has limited nanomotors' in vitro applications. One in vivo application, however, of microtube motors has been described for the first time by Joseph Wang and Liangfang Zhang using gastric acid as fuel. Recently titanium dioxide has also been identified as a potential candidate for nanomotors due to their corrosion resistance properties and biocompatibility. Future research into catalytical nanomotors holds major promise for important cargo-towing applications, ranging from cell sorting microchip devices to directed drug delivery.

A ribosome is a biological machine that utilizes protein domain dynamics on nanoscales

== Enzymatic nanomotors ==
Recently, there has been more research into developing enzymatic nanomotors and micropumps. At low Reynold's numbers, single molecule enzymes could act as autonomous nanomotors. Ayusman Sen and Samudra Sengupta demonstrated how self-powered micropumps can enhance particle transportation. This proof-of-concept system demonstrates that enzymes can be successfully utilized as an "engine" in nanomotors and micropumps. It has since been shown that particles themselves will diffuse faster when coated with active enzyme molecules in a solution of their substrate., and particles coated with active enzymes on a surface of their substrate have demonstrated directional motor-like motion. Microfluidic experiments have shown that enzyme molecules will undergo directional swimming up their substrate gradient. It has also been shown that catalysis is sufficient in rendering directed motion in enzymes. This remains the only method of separating enzymes based on activity alone. Additionally, enzymes in cascade have also shown aggregation based on substrate driven chemotaxis. Developing enzyme-driven nanomotors promises to inspire new biocompatible technologies and medical applications. However, several limitations, such as biocompatibility and cell penetration, have to be overcome for realizing these applications. One of the new biocompatible technologies would be to utilize enzymes for the directional delivery of cargo.

A proposed branch of research is the integration of molecular motor proteins found in living cells into molecular motors implanted in artificial devices. Such a motor protein would be able to move a "cargo" within that device, via protein dynamics, similarly to how kinesin moves various molecules along tracks of microtubules inside cells. Starting and stopping the movement of such motor proteins would involve caging the ATP in molecular structures sensitive to UV light. Pulses of UV illumination would thus provide pulses of movement. DNA nanomachines, based on changes between two molecular conformations of DNA in response to various external triggers, have also been described.

== Helical nanomotors ==
Another interesting direction of research has led to the creation of helical silica particles coated with magnetic materials that can be maneuvered using a rotating magnetic field.

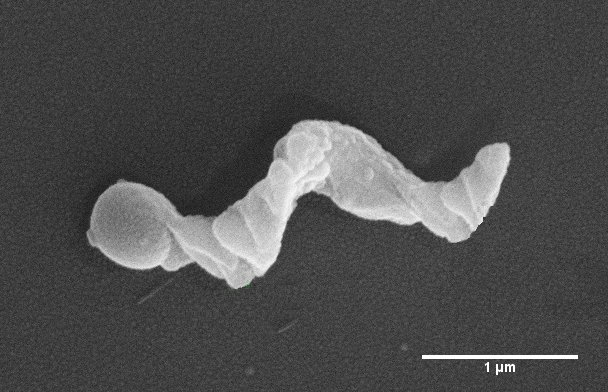
Scanning Electron Microscope image of a Helical nanomotor

Nanomotors are not dependent on chemical reactions to fuel propulsion. A triaxial Helmholtz coil can provide directed rotating field in space. Recent work has shown how such nanomotors can be used to measure viscosity of non-newtonian fluids at a resolution of a few microns. This technology promises creation of viscosity map inside cells and the extracellular milieu. Such nanomotors have been demonstrated to move in blood. Recently, researchers have managed to controllably move such nanomotors inside cancer cells allowing them to trace out patterns inside a cell. Nanomotors moving through the tumor microenvironment have demonstrated the presence of sialic acid in the cancer-secreted extracellular matrix.

== Current-driven nanomotors (Classical) ==
In 2003 Fennimore et al. presented the experimental realization of a prototypical current-driven nanomotor. It was based on tiny gold leaves mounted on multiwalled carbon nanotubes, with the carbon layers themselves carrying out the motion. The nanomotor is driven by the electrostatic interaction of the gold leaves with three gate electrodes where alternate currents are applied. Some years later, several other groups showed the experimental realizations of different nanomotors driven by direct currents. The designs typically consisted of organic molecules adsorbed on a metallic surface with a scanning-tunneling-microscope (STM) on top of it. The current flowing from the tip of the STM is used to drive the directional rotation of the molecule or of a part of it. The operation of such nanomotors relies on classical physics and is related to the concept of Brownian motors. These examples of nanomotors are also known as molecular motors.

== Quantum effects in current-driven nanomotors ==
Due to their small size, quantum mechanics plays an important role in some nanomotors. For example, in 2020 Stolz et al. showed the cross-over from classical motion to quantum tunneling in a nanomotor made of a rotating molecule driven by the STM's current. Cold-atom-based ac-driven quantum motors have been explored by several authors.

== See also ==
- Adiabatic quantum motor
- Carbon nanotube
- Electrostatic motor
- Micromotors
- Molecular motor
- Nanocar
- Nanomechanics
- Neutron spin echo
- Protein dynamics
- Synthetic molecular motors
