= Sandro Carrara =

Swiss scientist (born 1964)

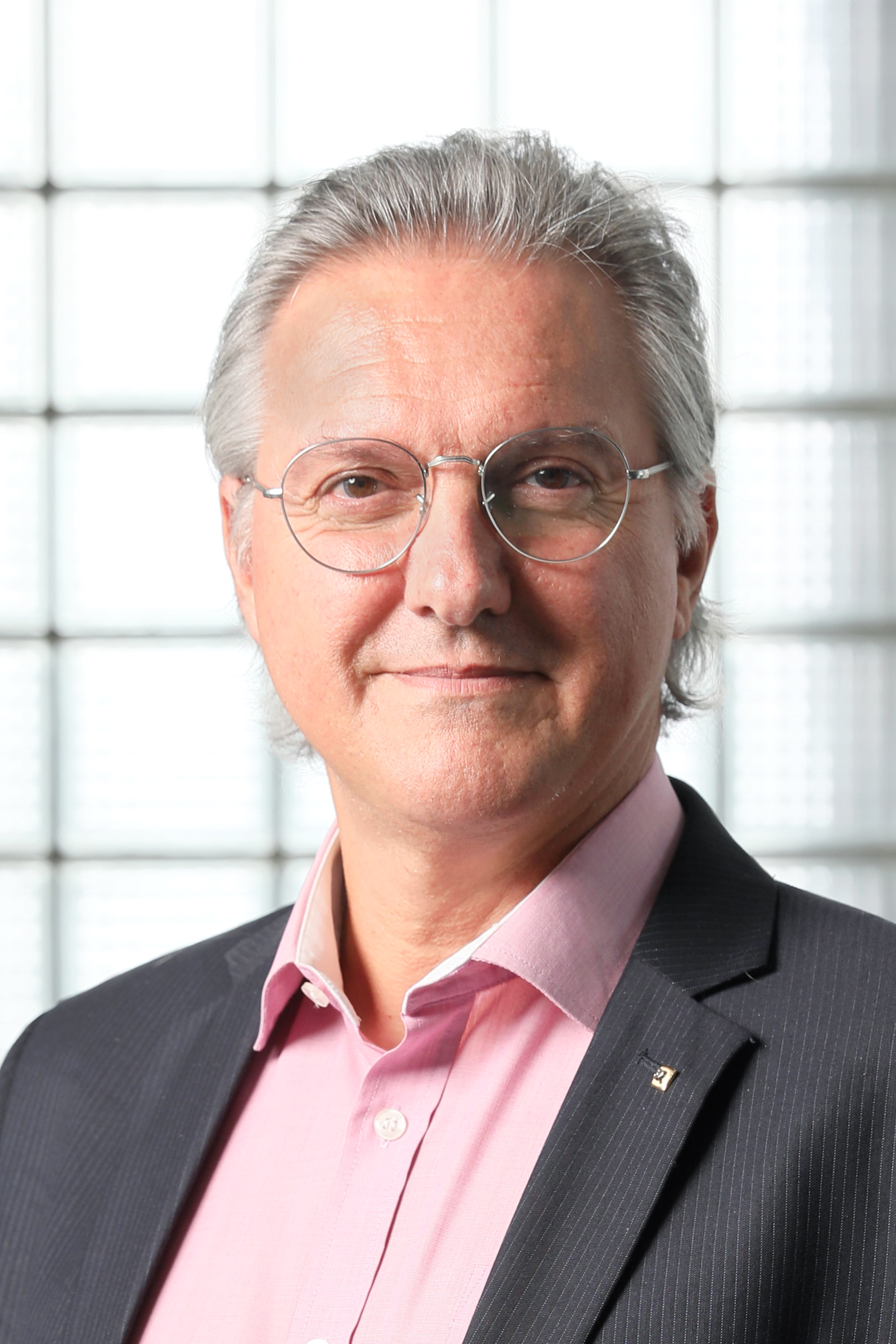
- Born: 17 May 1964 (age 62)
- Education: University of Genoa (Italy); University of Padua (Italy) (PhD.)
- Known for: bioelectronics biosensors Editor-in-Chief of the IEEE Sensors Journal
- Awards: IEEE Sensors Council Technical Achievement Award; IEEE Fellow (See List of fellows of IEEE Circuits and Systems Society); John Vig Award
- Scientific career
- Fields: Bioelectronics
- Workplaces: École polytechnique fédérale de Lausanne

Sandro Carrara (May 17, 1964) is a Swiss scientist and professor at the Swiss Federal Institute of Technology EPFL, in Lausanne, Switzerland. He is a Fellow of the Institute of Electrical and Electronics Engineers (IEEE) and he is mainly known for his pioneering work in the emerging area of co-design of bio/nano/CMOS interfaces as well as for his contributions to the design of nanoscale biological CMOS sensors. He is former Editor-in-Chief of the IEEE Sensors Journal, one of the largest among 240 IEEE publications. He is now the Founding Editor-in-Chief of the IEEE Sensors Magazine,

== Life ==
Carrara studied electronics at the Institute of Technology in Albenga, Italy, physics at the University of Genoa, Italy, and received a PhD from the University of Padua, Italy in 1998. He held a postdoctoral position at the University of Genoa, where he then became research associate and professor of optical and electrical biosensors at the Department of Electrical Engineering and Biophysics (DIBE). He was also professor of nanobiotechnology at University of Bologna (Italy), before joining EPFL in Lausanne, Switzerland, in 2007.

== Scientific contribution ==
Major achievements of Carrara and his group are in the fields of electrochemical biosensors, bioelectronics, and circuits and systems, especially to investigate new methods and devices for biomedical applications in remote monitoring of human metabolism, drug monitoring, personalized medicine, and precision medicine. He also made fundamental contributions in the field of biomolecular memristor.

== Awards ==
- Fellow of the Institute of Electrical and Electronics Engineers (IEEE) in 2016
- IEEE Sensors Council Technical Achievement Award
- John Vig Meritorious Service Award, in 2024
