= Joseph Wang =

American researcher and inventor (born 1948)

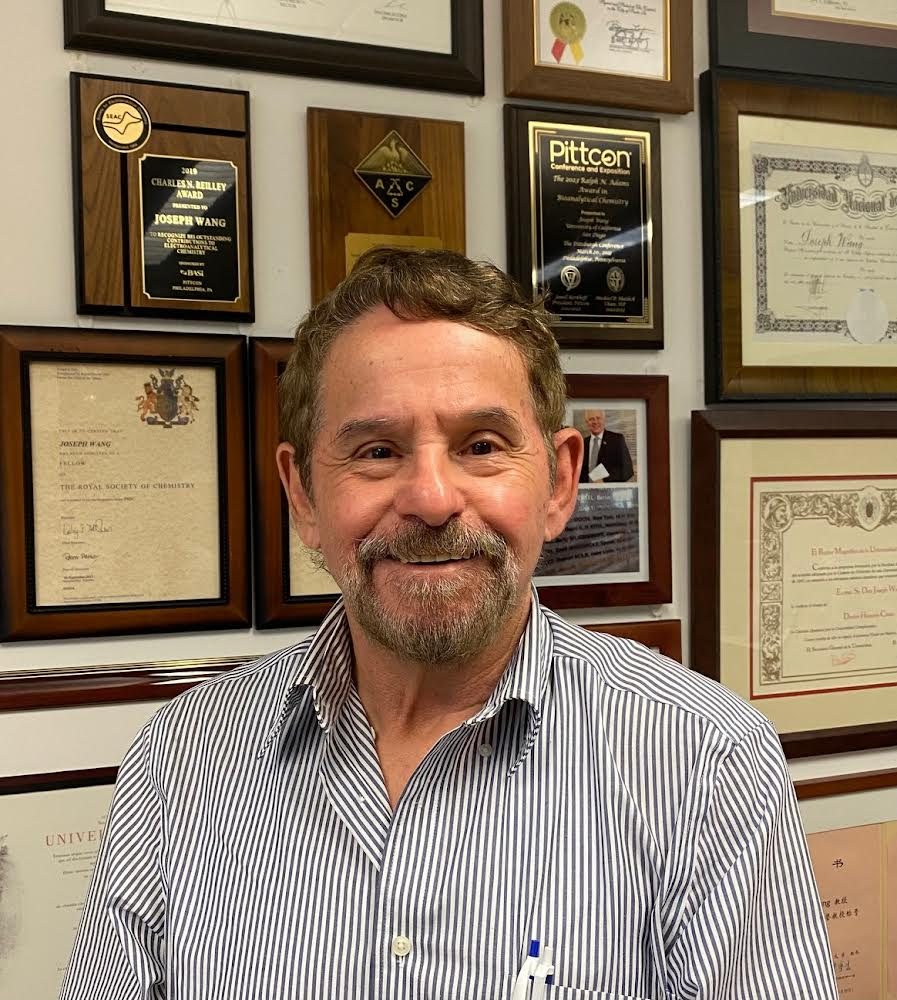
- Wang at the University of California San Diego in 2023
- Born: 1948 (age 77–78)
- Scientific career
- Fields: Nanotechnology, nanomachines, electrochemistry, biosensors
- Workplaces: University of California, San Diego

Joseph Wang (born 1948) is an American biomedical engineer and inventor. He is a Distinguished professor, SAIC Endowed Chair, and a former Chair of the Aiiso Yufeng Li Family Department of Chemical and Nano Engineering at the University of California, San Diego. Wang currently serves as the director of the UCSD Center for Wearable Sensors and as the co-director of the UCSD Center for Mobile Health Systems and Applications (CMSA).

== Biography ==
Joseph Wang was awarded a D.Sc. from the Technion in 1978 and subsequently worked as a postdoctoral research associate at the University of Wisconsin, Madison until 1980.

In 1980, Wang joined the Department of Chemistry and Biochemistry at New Mexico State University (NMSU), where he remained until 2004. During his tenure at NMSU, Wang was appointed Regents Professor and held the Manasse Chair from 2001 to 2004.

From 2004 to 2008, Wang served as the director of the Centre for Bioelectronics and Biosensors at the Biodesign Institute and as a professor of Chemical Engineering and Chemistry, at Arizona State University (ASU) in Tempe, AZ.

In 2008, Wang joined the Jacobs School of Engineering at the University of California, San Diego (UCSD), where he served as Chair of the Nanoengineering Department from 2014 to 2019.

Wang founded the journal Electroanalysis (published by Wiley-VCH) in 1988 and served as editor-in-chief until 2018.

Wang is a member of several academies, including the US National Academy of Inventors (elected in the class of 2022), the European Academy of Sciences and Arts (EASA), the National Academy of Albania, and the Turkish Academy of Sciences (TÜBA).

Wang was ranked World #1 in multiple fields: Electrochemistry, Microrobotics, Bioengineering, Analytical Chemistry for lifetime citation impact in the 2026 Scholarly Index Top 1000 Scholars.

Wang is a Fellow of the RSC, ECS, IUPAC and AIMBE, a recipient of the Heyrovsky Medal, the Talanta Medal, the IUPAC Medal and the Breyer Medal and holds an Honorary Professor from 9 leading universities in Spain. Czech Republic, China, Romania and Slovakia. He is the recipient of ACS Awards in Analytical Chemistry, Electrochemistry and Analytical Instrumentation.

== Fields of research ==
Wang's early research focused on electrochemical biosensors and detectors for clinical diagnostics and environmental monitoring, mainly on blood glucose monitoring for diabetes management. His current research includes the development of nanomotors and nanomachines, wearable non-invasive sensors, electrochemical biosensors, bioelectronics, microfluidic (“Lab-on-a-Chip”) systems, and remote sensors for environmental and security monitoring.

Wang directed a team that combined efforts in the fields of biosensors, bioelectronics, and nanotechnology to fashion nanocrystals that can act as amplifying tags for DNA or protein biosensors. His work in the field of nanomachines, involving novel motor designs and applications, has led to a fast nanomotor, the first demonstration of nanomotor operation in a living organism, embedding microrobots within oral pills, motion-based DNA biosensing, nanomachine-enabled isolation of biological targets, such as cancer cell identification, and advanced motion control in the nanoscale.

Wang has also introduced the use of body-worn flexible electrochemical sensors for non-invasive biomarker monitoring and epidermal biofuel cells that harvest energy from sweat, including textile and epidermal-tattoo devices, touch-based fingertip sweat sensing, microneedle-based electrochemical biosensors for quantification of circulating metabolites and electrolytes. He introduced multi-modal sensing platforms that offer simultaneous real-time monitoring of chemical markers, and vital signs such as blood pressure, ECG, and EEG. Wang also introduced on-body microgrid systems for managing the power requirements of wearable sensor platforms. His work towards portable environmental and security sensor systems includes new 'green' bismuth electrodes for sensing toxic metals, remote submersible devices for continuous environmental monitoring, and a hand-held lead analyzer.

Wang published over 1300 papers on these topics that were cited over 200,000 times, leading to a H Index of 227.

== Published books ==
- Stripping Analysis: Principles, Instrumentation, and Applications - 1985
- Electrochemical Techniques in Clinical Chemistry and Laboratory Medicine - 1988
- Biosensors and Chemical Sensors - 1992, with Peter G. Edelman
- Analytical Electrochemistry - 1st, 2nd, 3rd, and 4th editions from 1994, 1999, 2006 and 2023, respectively
- Biosensors for Direct Monitoring of Environmental Pollutants in Field - 1997, with Dimitrios P. Nicolelis, Ulrich J. Krull, and Marco Mascini
- Electrochemistry of Nucleic Acids and Proteins - 2005, with Emil Paleček and Frieder W. Scheller
- Electrochemical Sensors, Biosensors and their Biomedical Applications - 2007, with Xueji Zhang and Huangxian Ju
- Nano Biosensing: Principles, Development and Application - 2011, with Xueji Zhang and Huangxian Ju
- Nanomachines: Fundamentals and Applications - 2013
