= Fortino Sámano =

Military trial of Captain Fortino

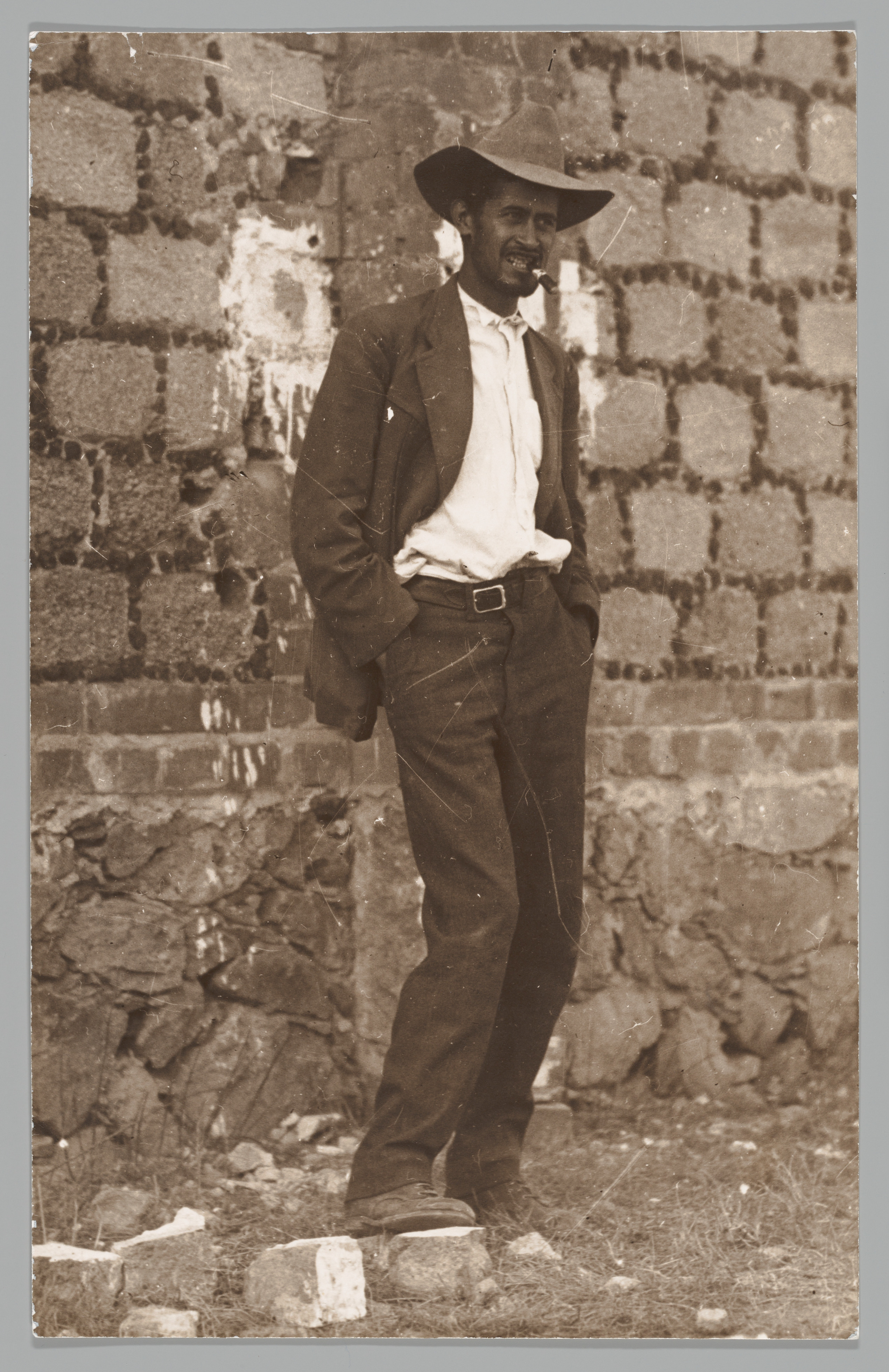
Fortino Samano moments before his execution

Carlos Fortino Sámano was a 1st rank captain (Capitán primero) of the Constitutional Army under Venustiano Carranza during the Mexican Revolution. He was accused of robbery with violence against an old lady, and after a military trial was sentenced to death in 1916 and finally was executed by a Federal firing squad on 2 March 1917. Before being executed, his last will was a glass of Chile chipotle liquor, which was conceded by his executioners.

== Picture of Casasola ==
He became a well-known figure because of the picture, taken by Agustín Víctor Casasola who captured him standing before his executioners, unblindfolded, calm, smoking a cigar. He was the theme of the book, by Virginie Lalucq and Jean-Luc Nancy, Fortino Sámano (The Overflowing of the Poem) and the Greek song "Fortino Samano" (Greek: Ο Φορτίνο Σαμάνο), found in the album Samano (Greek: Ο Σαμάνος) by Thanasis Papakonstantinou. In that sources there is the claim that he was supposed to be a rebel and lieutenant of Emiliano Zapata forces.
