= Liangfang Zhang =

Chinese-American nanoengineer

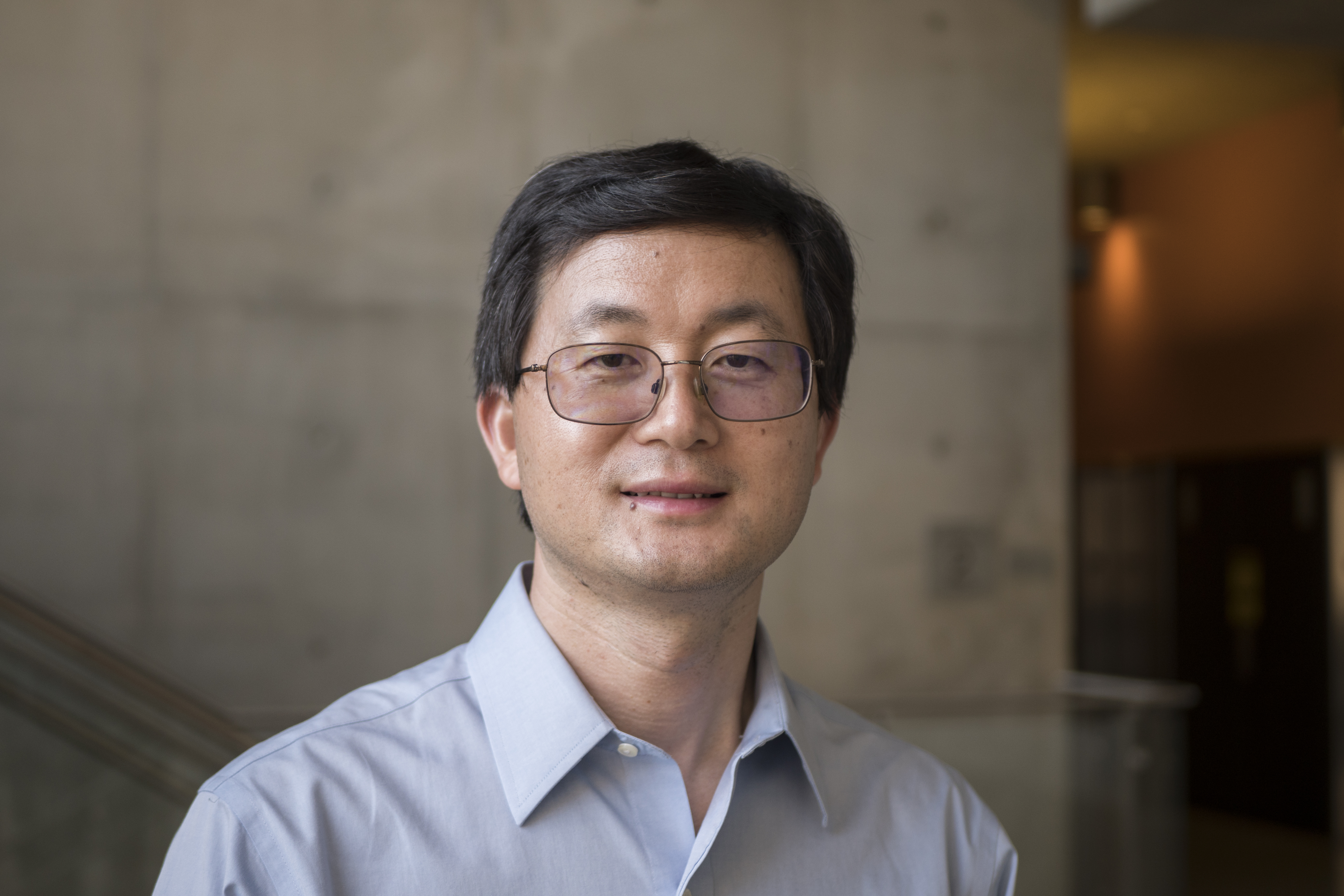
- Born: Wuwei County, China
- Spouse: Lili Xie

Academic background
- Education: Tsinghua University (BS, MS); University of Illinois Urbana-Champaign (PhD)
- Thesis: Polymers, nanoparticles and phospholipids (2006)
- Academic advisors: Steve Granick; Robert S. Langer

Liangfang Zhang is a Chinese-American nanoengineer. He is the Chancellor Professor of Nanoengineering and Bioengineering and Director of Aiiso Yufeng Li Family Department of Chemical and Nano Engineering at the University of California, San Diego. Zhang is a Fellow of the American Institute for Medical and Biological Engineering, American Association for the Advancement of Science, and the National Academy of Inventors. He received a MacArthur Fellowship in 2026.

== Early life and education ==
Zhang was born in Wuwei County, China and began attending university at the age of 15. He completed his Bachelor of Science and Master's degree in chemical engineering from Tsinghua University before moving to the United States and enrolling at the University of Illinois Urbana-Champaign for his PhD. While attending Tsinghua, Zhang helped create a tough rubber polymer that could be used in construction engineering. As a PhD candidate, Zhang worked with Steve Granick to turn nanoparticles into biocompatible capsules. This way of stabilizing lipids enabled them to be used in drug delivery, colloidal-based biosensors, and enzyme-catalyzed reactions. Zhang later credited Granick and Robert S. Langer for inspiring his "current career path" through their "very distinct trainings."

== Career ==
Following his PhD, Liangfang Zhang became a postdoctoral associate at Massachusetts Institute of Technology (MIT) before joining the Department of Nanoengineering at the University of California, San Diego (UCSD) as an assistant professor in 2008. As an assistant professor, Zhang's research team became the first to combine the natural cell membrane with a synthetic nanoparticle for drug delivery applications. In 2011, he oversaw a study which developed a drug delivery system that mimiced the body's natural behavior for more effective drug delivery. They found that a biodegradable polymer nanoparticle filled with small molecule drugs and red blood cell membrane could circulate in the bodies of mice for nearly two days. By disguising the drug in red blood cell membrane, the drugs could evade the body's immune system and deliver cancer-fighting drugs straight to a tumor. Following this discovery, Zhang also used nanoparticles in vaccines to enable immune systems to block the adverse effects of the alpha-haemolysin toxin from MRSA. His research was recognized with the American Chemical Society's (ACS) 2012 Colloid and Surface Division Unilever Award. He was also recognized by the MIT Technology Review as being among the top young innovators under the age of 35 of 2013. He was specifically recognized for his technology for cloaking nanoparticles in natural red blood cell membranes. The following year, Zhang received the American Institute of Chemical Engineers (AIChE) Allan P. Colburn Award for Excellence in Publications by a Young Member of the Institute for "outstanding contributions to biomimetic nanomaterials for drug delivery to improve the treatments of cancers and infectious diseases."

In March 2015, Zhang was elected a Fellow of the American Institute for Medical and Biological Engineering for "outstanding contributions to creating and advancing biomimetic nanomaterials for drug delivery to improve treatment of cancers and infectious diseases." Later that year, he designed nanoparticles disguised as human platelets to deliver drugs to targeted sites in the body. His research team demonstrated that by delivering the drugs just to the areas where the drugs were needed, the nanoparticles greatly increased the therapeutic effects of drugs that were administered to diseased rats and mice. Zhang was later recognized by Popular Science as being one of the 10 most brilliant people of 2016. In 2017, Zhang was part of a group of UCSD nanoengineers who were the first to use micromotors to treat a bacterial infection in the stomach. By placing micromotors throughout the stomach, they neutralized gastric acid and then released their cargo of antibiotics at the desired pH. As a result, Zhang was selected as the United States nominee for the APEC Science Prize for Innovation, Research and Education (ASPIRE) and received the 2017 Kabiller Young Investigator Award from Northwestern University. The following year, Zhang was elected a Fellow of the American Association for the Advancement of Science for "his revolutionary work in the field of nanomedicine, which focuses on nanomaterials for medical applications."

During the COVID-19 pandemic, Zhang's laboratory began using his biomimetic nanosponge to fight the coronavirus. He believed that the nanosponge cloaked with fragments of the outer membranes of macrophages could soak up inflammatory cytokine proteins, which are implicated in some of the most dangerous aspects of COVID-19. Zhang's Cellics Therapeutics later received an award from the Combating Antibiotic Resistant Bacteria Biopharmaceutical Accelerator to develop a macrophage cellular nanosponge in order to treat sepsis. In December 2020, Zhang was recognised as being among the world's most influential researcher in his field from the Web of Science group. He was also elected a Fellow of the National Academy of Inventors for his "revolutionary work in the field of nanomedicine." In 2021, Zhang won the Journal of Nanobiotechnology Trailblazer Award "for outstanding contributions to creating and advancing biomimetic nanotechnologies for drug delivery and biological neutralization to improve human health."

== Personal life ==
Zhang and his wife Lili Xie, an economist, have two daughters together.
