= IEEE Sensors Journal =

Biweekly peer-reviewed scientific journal

- Discipline: Sensors
- Language: English
- Edited by: Sandro Carrara

Publication details
- History: 2001–present
- Publisher: IEEE Sensors Council
- Frequency: Biweekly
- Impact factor: 4.5 (2024)

Standard abbreviations
- ISO 4: IEEE Sens. J.

Indexing
- CODEN: ISJEAZ
- ISSN: 1530-437X
- LCCN: 00214867
- OCLC no.: 44160724

Links
- Journal homepage; Online archive

The IEEE Sensors Journal is a biweekly peer-reviewed scientific journal, covering research on sensors. It is published by the IEEE Sensors Council, and it is the largest journal by topic among 240 IEEE publications. The editor-in-chief is Zeynep Celik. According to the Journal Citation Reports, the journal has a 2024 impact factor of 4.5, as well as an Eigenfactor at 0.06595, and an Article Influence Score at 0.745

== Journal leadership ==
Editor-in-Chief	Start date	End date
Vladimir Lumelsky, University of Wisconsin Madison, USA	2001	2003
H Troy Nagle, North Carolina State University, USA	2004	2009
Evgeny Katz, Clarkson University, USA	2009	2011
Krikor B Ozanyan, The University of Manchester, England	2012	2018
Sandro Carrara, EPFL, Lausanne, Switzerland	2018	2024
Zeynep Celik, University of Texas, Arlington, USA	2024	Present

== Best paper awards ==
The annual IEEE Sensors Journal Best Paper Award recognizes the best paper published in the journal. Winners are presented with a certificate and $2,000 split equally among the authors.
