= Ali Javey =

American chemist and nanotechnologist

Ali Javey is a professor of electrical engineering and computer sciences at the University of California, Berkeley, a senior faculty scientist at the Lawrence Berkeley National Laboratory, and co-director of the Bay Area Photovoltaic Consortium and the Berkeley Sensor and Actuator Center. His research is focused on materials and device innovation for technological applications, particularly photovoltaics, wearable sensors, nanoelectronics, and programmable materials.

Javey is an Associate Editor for ACS Nano.

== Education ==
Javey received his BS in chemistry from Old Dominion University in 2001 and his PhD in physical chemistry from Stanford University in 2005. His PhD advisor was Hongjie Dai. He was a junior fellow of the Harvard Society of Fellows from 2005 to 2006.

== Honors and awards ==
- Dan Maydan Prize in Nanoscience and Nanotechnology (2020)
- Bakar Fellow – UC Berkeley (2016)
- MRS Outstanding Young Investigator Award (2015)
- Nano Letters Young Investigator Lectureship (2014)
- UC Berkeley Electrical Engineering Outstanding Teaching Award (2012)
- APEC Science Prize for Innovation, Research and Education (2011)
- Netexplorateur of the Year Award (2011)
- IEEE Nanotechnology Early Career Award (2010)
- Alfred P. Sloan Fellow (2010)
- Mohr Davidow Ventures Innovators Award (2010)
- National Academy of Sciences Award for Initiatives in Research (2009)
- Technology Review TR35 (2009)
- NSF Early CAREER Award (2008)
- U.S. Frontiers of Engineering by National Academy of Engineering (2008)
- Peter Verhofstadt Fellowship from the Semiconductor Research Corporation (2003).
