= Frank R. Mayo =

Research chemist (1908-1987)

- Born: June 23, 1908; Chicago, Illinois
- Died: October 3, 1987 (aged 79); Menlo Park, California
- Education: University of Chicago
- Known for: Mayo–Lewis equation
- Awards: 1967 ACS Award in Polymer Chemistry
- Scientific career
- Workplaces: University of Chicago DuPont; U.S. Rubber; General Electric Research Laboratory SRI International
- Doctoral advisor: Morris S. Kharasch
- Notable students: Joseph J. Katz

Frank R. Mayo (June 23, 1908 – October 30, 1987) was a research chemist who worked for a variety of companies and won the 1967 Award in Polymer Chemistry from the American Chemical Society for his work on the Mayo–Lewis equation in polymer chemistry which describes the distribution of monomers in a copolymer.

== Early life and education ==
Mayo was born on June 23, 1908, in Chicago, Illinois.

He attended the University of Chicago, receiving his B.S. in chemistry in 1929. He did his doctoral work at the University of Chicago, receiving his Ph.D. in chemistry in 1931. He studied with Morris S. Kharasch.

== Career ==
For an autobiographical account of the discovery of the peroxide effect see J. Chem. Educ., 63, 97-99(1986) and ref. 1 therein.

== Awards and memberships ==
Mayo was involved in the Division of Polymer Chemistry (POLY) of the American Chemical Society (ACS), and was vice-chair in 1958 and chair in 1959, and also held the role of councilor from 1958 to 1960. CS awarded Mayo the 1967 ACS Award in Polymer Chemistry; and in 1985, he received POLY's Distinguished Service Award.
