= Fortini Ground =

Football ground in Birgu, Malta

Coordinates: 35.8864°N 14.5250°E

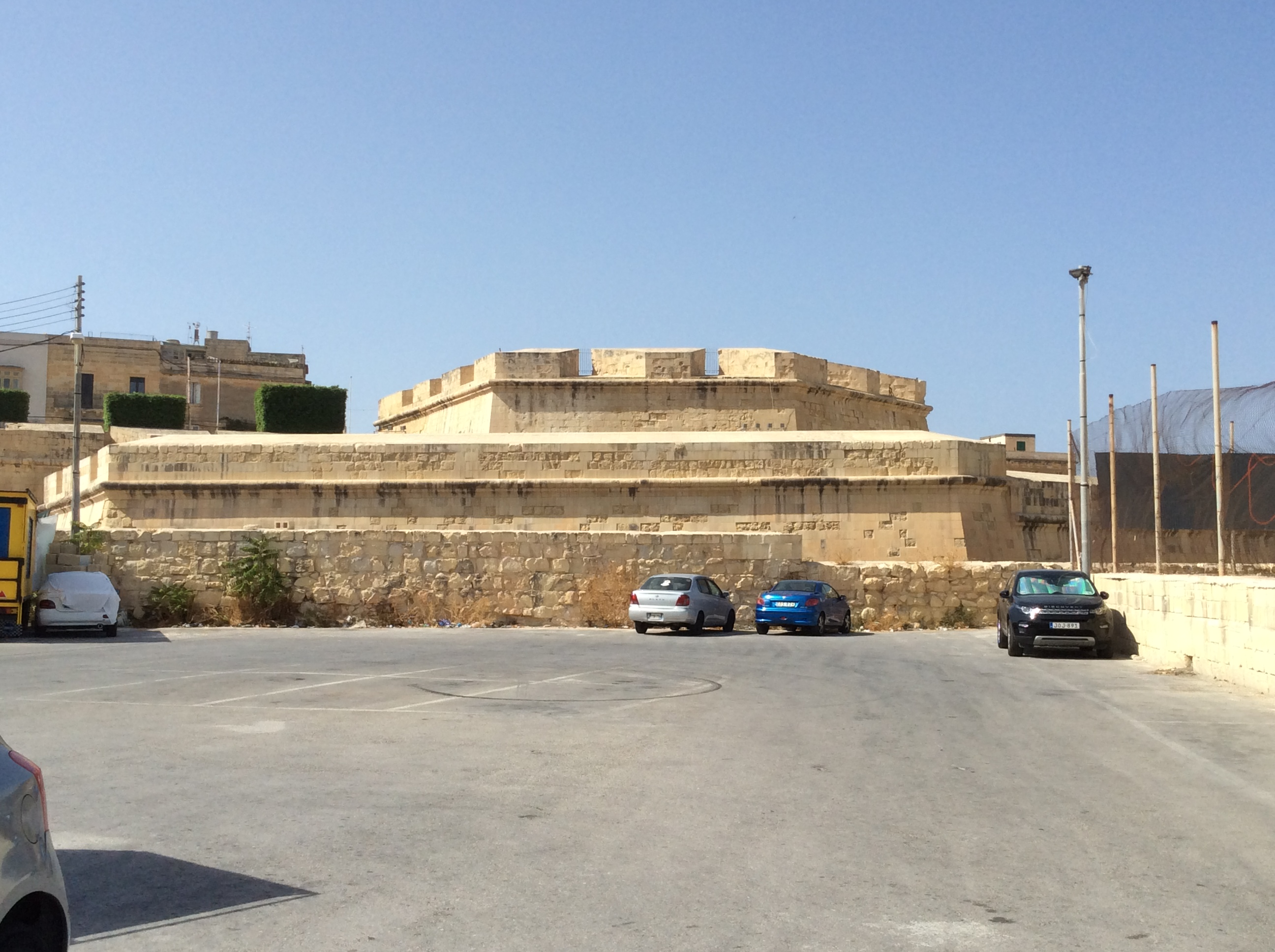
A car park near the ground, which is located just right of this photo. The name fortini is likely a reference to St James Cavalier, visible in the centre of this photo.

Fortini Ground is a former football ground in Birgu, Malta which was the home ground of Maltese football club Vittoriosa Stars F.C., which plays in the Maltese Premier League. It had a capacity of 1,000 spectators.

The area was formerly part of the glacis of the fortifications of Birgu. The name fortini (meaning "small fort") is likely a reference to St James Cavalier, a raised platform on St James Bastion located across the ditch from the ground. The bastion is linked to a street adjacent to the ground through a bridge and a sally port known as the Capuchin's Gate or il-Mina tal-Fortini.

In the late 19th century, the British Army demolished parts of the fortifications' outworks and levelled off the area in order to create the St Lawrence Parade Ground for soldiers stationed in nearby barracks and at Fort San Salvatore. The parade ground was used for sport activities prior to World War II, and during the war the area was heavily damaged by aerial bombardment.

After the war, in around 1947 the Vittoriosa football club began making plans to use the ground, and an application in this regard was submitted in 1950. A school was built to the east of the ground in the 1950s, followed by government housing and a car park to its west in the 1970s; these further encroached upon what remained of the glacis.

The area is no longer a football ground and it is now used as a temporary car park, housing an open-air car boot sale on Sundays.
