= John Tenaglia =

American opera singer

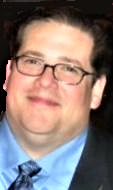
- Born: February 5, 1964 (age 62)

John Tenaglia (born February 5, 1964) is a baritone opera singer.

== Early years ==
John F. Tenaglia was born in South Philadelphia, February 5, 1964, to parents Frank (Francesco) and Dorothy (nee Cavella). Being up in an Italian-American family, where culture served as a constant guidance. Especially in education, culinary and musical arts, with firm religious aspects. At age 8 John started violin lessons with the famed violinist and conductor Joseph Primavera of the Philadelphia Orchestra and founder of the Philadelphia Youth Orchestra. Young John had little to no interest in the instrument. In 1978, The Tenaglia Family was invited to a performance of Puccini's Madama Butterfly being presented at the Forum Theater in South Philadelphia. The person singing Pinkerton that night was renowned tenor Frank Munafo (a graduate of the Curtis Institute of Music). John was so inspired by Munafo's singing, he instantly knew this is what he wanted to do for the rest of his life. Mr. Tenaglia was quoted saying; "I felt that Frank Munafo was singing directly to me, even though there were hundreds in the audience!" Having minimal musical training at this age and limited knowledge of opera, the young man instinctively started listening to recordings found in his families house of Mario Lanza, Mario Del Monaco, Beniamino Gigli and Richard Tucker. This also encouraged him to join local church choirs where he could learn more about the art of singing. Inevitably, for the 13-year-old, nature took its course and John was no longer able to imitate these wonderful tenors. Dejected, he thought he'd never be able to sing like his idol Frank Munafo. His church choir director told him he should start singing in the baritone and bass sections. As John entered junior high he became a member of the choir at Thomas Junior High School. This is where Mr. Tenaglia met his soon-to-be mentor William Yeats. Mr. Yeats was also a renowned tenor (a graduate of Indiana University and Curtis Institute of Music) and the choir director at South Philadelphia High School. Mr. Yeats, would go around to all the local junior high schools to recruit talent for his high school choir. Mr. Yeats recognized talent in Mr. Tenaglia but said nothing to the youngster until he officially became a student of the famous South Philadelphia High School. John had no idea of the background and caliber of his teacher. One afternoon as John was on his way to his next class, when he heard what he thought was a recording playing of Che gelida mania from La Bohème. As John looked into the room from where the music was coming, here it was William Yeats accompanying himself and singing the aria in preparation for an upcoming concert. Tenaglia quietly snuck in the room. Standing there, listening as Mr. Yeats continued to sing the aria as tears ran down the face of the young student, stunned from the sheer beauty of Mr. Yeats's singing. John moved to find a comfortable standing position as a book fell off the desk behind him. Mr. Yeats turned around startled, yelled at him and said; "what are you doing in here?! You're Not Supposed to be in here!!" Tenaglia's answer was; "why are you singing that, you're not Italian!" They both looked at each other and instantly broke into laughter. That is the moment their father, son relationship began. Mr. Yeats explained to John, that he had a talent. So he offered him a deal. "If John promised to take music seriously and pursue it as his career, he in turn offered him free voice lessons every day after school for his remaining time at South Philadelphia High School all free of charge!" There was one catch, Tenaglia had to promise him, that one day he would also give back this service to a young promising student.

== Education and career ==
John Tenaglia was accepted on scholarship to the Philadelphia College of the Performing Arts where he studied with famed teacher Vivian Wagner. John earned a Bachelor of Music and Masters of Music Degrees in 5 years of study finishing in 1986. In the summers he traveled the country as a member of the "Tenaglia Trio" with his future wife Soprano Joan (Kratowicz)Tenaglia and younger brother, Tenor Frank Tenaglia (another prodigy of William Yeats). They performed Operatic and Crossover Concerts. Quite often they were invited to perform as headliners with the Legendary Pat Cooper, the Late Arturo Coppola in Concert Halls and Major Italian Festivals. At age 19, Tenaglia's 1st professional role was Papageno in Mozart's Magic Flute. As a young baritone he performed the roles of Marcello and Schaunard in Puccini's La Boheme, Count Almaviva in Le Nozze di Figaro, Baron Zeta in Franz Lehár's The Merry Widow, Pish-Tush in Gilbert and Sullivan's Mikado and Silvio in Leoncavallo's Pagliacci. As years went by, maturity had begun to develop into the baritone's voice. Noticing that his natural ability was being compromised, Mr Tenaglia desperately searched for a teacher who could help him incorporate his natural ability with a solid technique. Colleagues led him to famed teachers Armin Boyajian, Richard Barrett and Enrico di Giuseppe, all to no avail. Frank Munafo suggested and introduced him to Gary Magby. Mr. Magby was a singer himself, however was recognized as a master vocal coach and conductor. Mr.Tenaglia made such a connection with Gary Magby. Mr. Magby built John's technique and introduced the spirituality and musicality that's needed to accompany it. Subsequently, Mr. Tenaglia was then being hired for more demanding roles such as Tonio in Leoncavallo's Pagliacci, Sharpless in Puccini's Madama Butterfly, Scarpia in Tosca, Gianni Schicchi-Gianni Schicchi. Germont in Verdi's La Traviata, Rigoletto in Rigoletto and Amonasro in Aida. Mr. Tenaglia was invited to perform the lead roles in world premieres. His first was Mr. Jenkins in Libby Larson's A Wrinkle in Time commissioned through OperaDelaware.

Throughout John Tenaglia's career he has sung with most of the major opera companies in the United States. Some of which include: OperaDelaware, Chautauqua Opera (also where he served his union apprenticeship), Opera Company of Philadelphia, New York City Opera, Pennsylvania Opera Theater, Cape Cod Lyric, Florentine Opera, Florham Opera, Berks Grand Opera, Chicago Symphony, Chautauqua Symphony, Haddonfield Symphony, Warminster Symphony.

== Oratorio work ==
Aside from John Tenaglia's operatic career he extensively performed the sacred works of Laudes Avangeli (United States premiere Bruno Rigacci conductor) Handel's Messiah, Mendelssohn's Elijah, Mozart's Requiem, Verdi's Requiem, Faure's Requiem, Mozart's C Minor, Liszt's Via Crucis. Brahms Requiem, Beethoven's 9th Symphony.

He recently retired after 26 years as music director and conductor of the Adult Choir and Orchestra at St. Peter Roman Catholic Church in Merchantville New Jersey.

Along with a demanding performance schedule, Mr. Tenaglia kept his promise to Mr. William Yeats and manages to maintain a private voice studio of young professional singers free of charge.

== Awards ==
He has won or been a finalist in the:

- Mario Lanza Competitio
- Luciano Pavarotti Competition
- Sergio Franchi Scholarship
- Metropolitan Opera Eastern Regionals
- National Finalist Association of Teachers of Singers
- Two-time 1st place winner March 9, 1985 & March 8, 1986
- Nominated for: Outstanding Young Men of America 1985 Montgomery, Alabama

== Discography ==
- Violinist Nadja Salerno-Sonnenberg Christmas CD. Recorded live at St. Peter Church in 2010. Guest Artist John Tenaglia
- Voices for Children Christmas CDs, a collaboration of accomplished professional Philadelphia Classical Musicians all to benefit Pediatric Aids.
