= Fortino Carrillo Sandoval =

Mexican politician (born 1959)

- Born: 8 August 1959 (age 66); Colotlán, Jalisco, Mexico
- Occupation: Politician
- Political party: PAN

Fortino Carrillo Sandoval (born 8 August 1959) is a Mexican politician from the National Action Party. In 2009 he served as Deputy of the LX Legislature of the Mexican Congress representing Jalisco.
