= Gerhard L. Closs =

Gerhard Ludwig Closs (May 1, 1928 – May 24, 1992) was an American chemist specializing in physical organic chemistry, member of the National Academy of Sciences and the American Academy of Arts and Sciences, chairman of the chemistry department at the University of Chicago. Closs made seminal contributions in research of the magnetic properties of the intermediate compounds formed in chemical reactions. He is also credited with the discovery that certain reactions polarize atomic nuclei. The National Academies Press called him "one of the outstanding chemists of the post-World War II era". He was also an early leader in the field of carbene chemistry. The New York Times called him "pioneering chemist".

== Awards and Distinctions ==
- Jean Servas Stas Medal by the Belgian Chemical Society in 1971
- James Flack Norris award by the American Chemical Society in 1974
- Arthur C. Cope Award by the American Chemical Society in 1991
- Photochemistry Prize by the Inter-American Photochemical Association in 1992
- elected to the National Academy of Sciences in 1974
- elected to the American Academy of Arts and Sciences in 1975
- The Inter-American Photochemical Association honors his memory with the G. L. Closs Memorial Award
