= Fortino Tenaglia Lighthouse =

Fortino Tenaglia
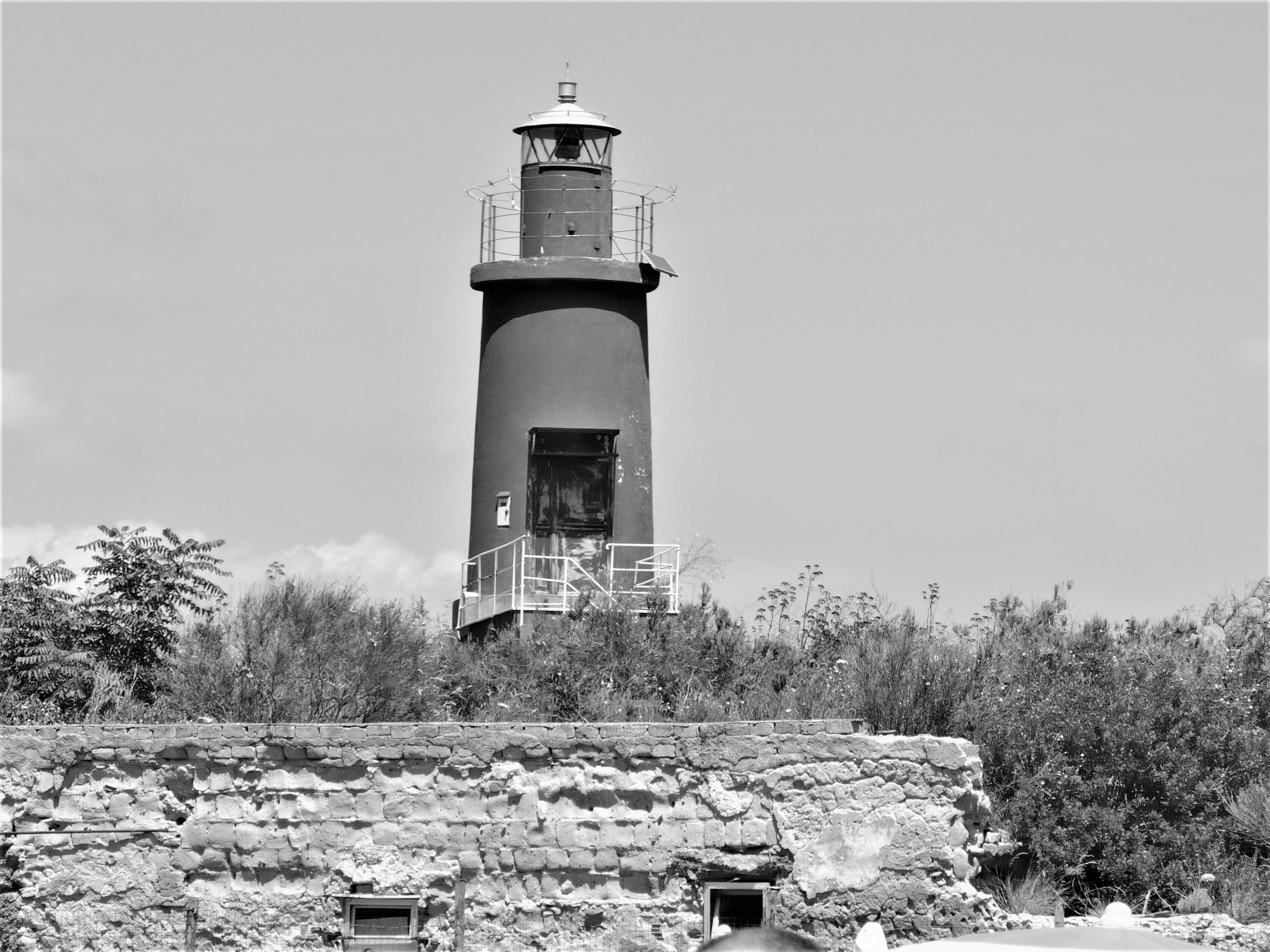
- Fortino Tenaglia Lighthouse
- Location: Bacoli; Campania; Italy
- Coordinates: 40°48′44″N 14°04′57″E

Tower
- Constructed: 1856 (first)
- Foundation: concrete base
- Construction: concrete tower
- Automated: yes
- Height: 8 metres (26 ft)
- Shape: cylindrical tower with balcony and lantern atop a 1-storey red service building
- Markings: red tower
- Power source: solar power
- Operator: Marina Militare

Light
- First lit: 1950s
- Focal height: 13 metres (43 ft)
- Lens: Type TD
- Intensity: LABI 100 W
- Range: 8 nautical miles (15 km; 9.2 mi)
- Characteristic: Iso R 4s.
- Italy no.: 2406 E.F.

Fortino Tenaglia Lighthouse (Italian: Faro di Fortino Tenaglia) is an active lighthouse located on a promontory on the west side of the Gulf of Pozzuoli in the municipality of Bacoli, Campania on the Tyrrhenian Sea.

== Description ==
The first lighthouse was established in 1856 under the Kingdom of the Two Sicilies while the current date back to the post-war period. It consists of a red concrete cylindrical tower, 8 feet (2.4 m) high, with balcony and lantern, mounted on a red service building. The lantern, painted in grey metallic, is positioned at 13 metres (43 ft) above sea level and emits a red flash on and off in a 4 seconds period, visible up to a distance of 8 nautical miles (15 km; 9.2 mi). The lighthouse is completely automated and powered by a solar unit and operated by the Marina Militare with the identification code number 2406 E.F.

== See also ==
- List of lighthouses in Italy
- Bacoli
