= Micromotor =

Micromotors are very small particles (measured in microns) that can move themselves. The term is often used interchangeably with "nanomotor," despite the implicit size difference. These micromotors actually propel themselves in a specific direction autonomously when placed in a chemical solution. There are many different micromotor types operating under a host of mechanisms. Easily the most important examples are biological motors such as bacteria and any other self-propelled cells. Synthetically, researchers have exploited oxidation-reduction reactions to produce chemical gradients, local fluid flows, or streams of bubbles that then propel these micromotors through chemical media. Different stimuli, both external (light, magnetism) and internal (fuel concentration, material composition, particle asymmetry) can be used to control the behavior of these micromotors.

Micromotors may have applications in medicine since they have been shown to be able to deliver materials to living cells within an organism. They also have been shown to be effective in degrading certain chemical and biological warfare agents.

== Janus Motor Propulsion ==
Janus particle micromotors consist of two or more components with distinct physical properties, such as a titanium dioxide particle capped with gold, or a polystyrene bead coated on one side with a layer of platinum which both display a difference in catalytic activity between halves. When these motors are placed in a fuel, such as hydrogen peroxide, one redox half-reaction occurs on each pole according to catalytic activity. As the oxidation reaction produces electrons and protons, the reduction reaction consumes these as reactants on the opposite pole of the particle, this movement of molecules generates a fluid flow across the surface of the motor and this drives the particle forward. The catalytic difference between each pole of the Janus motor can be characteristic of the material such as metals which catalyze at different rates, or induced by external stimuli like UV light which can be absorbed by semi-conductor materials like titanium dioxide to excite electrons for the redox reaction.

Catalytic activity is not the only way to generate motion using Janus materials; self-propelled Janus droplets can be made using a complex emulsion of two different surfactant oils which move forward spontaneously due to the difference in surface tension as the two oils solubilize.

However, a Janus structure is not always required to break symmetry. For enzyme-attached particles or lipid vesicles, symmetry can be disrupted by the uneven distribution of enzymes on their surface. These discoveries offer new insights into designing synthetic micro/nanomotors.

=== Nano particle Implementation ===
Nano particle incorporation into micromotors has been recently studied and observed further. Specifically, gold nanoparticles have been introduced to the traditional titanium dioxide outer layer of most micromotors. The size of these gold nanoparticles typically is distributed from anywhere around 3 nm to 30 nm. Since these gold nanoparticles are layered on top of the inner core (usually a reducing agent, such as magnesium), there is enhanced macrogalvanic corrosion observed. Technically, this is where the cathode and anode are in contact with each other, creating a circuit. The cathode, as a result of the circuit, is corroded. The depletion of this inner core leads to the reduction of the chemical environment as a fuel source. For example, in a TiO_{2}/Au/Mg micromotor in a seawater environment, the magnesium inner core would experience corrosion and reduce water to begin a chain of reactions that results in hydrogen gas as a fuel source. The reduction reaction is as follows: $Mg + 2H_2O \to Mg(OH)_2 + H_2$

== Applications ==
Researchers hope that micromotors will be used in medicine to deliver medication and do other precise small-scale interventions. A study has shown that micromotors could deliver gold particles to the stomach layer of living mice.

== Photocatalytic Degradation of Biological and Chemical Warfare Agents ==
Micromotors are capable of photocatalytic degradation with the appropriate composition. Specifically, micromotors with a titanium dioxide/gold nanoparticle outer layer and magnesium inner core are currently being examined and studied for their degradation efficacy against chemical and biological warfare agents (CBWA). These new TiO_{2}/Au/Mg micromotors produce no reagents or toxic byproducts from the propulsion and degradation mechanisms. However, they are very effective against CBWAs and present a complete and rapid degradation of certain CBWAs. There has been recent research of TiO_{2}/Au/Mg micromotors and their use and degradation efficacy against biological warfare agents, such as Bacillus anthracis, and chemical warfare agents, such as organophosphate nerve agents- a class of acetylcholinesterase inhibitors. Therefore, application of these micromotors is a possibility for medical and environmental applications.

=== Photocatalytic Degradation Mechanism ===
These new micromotors are composed of a photoactive photocatalyst outer/surface layer that often has active metal nanoparticles (platinum, gold, silver, etc.) on the surface as well. Under UV irradiation, the adsorbed water produces strongly oxidizing hydroxyl radicals. Also, adsorbed molecular O_{2} reacts with electrons producing superoxide anions. Those superoxide anions also produce to the production of peroxide radicals, hydroxyl radicals, and hydroxyl anions. Transformation into carbon dioxide and water, otherwise known as mineralization, of CWAs has been observed as a result of the radicals and anions. Also, the active metal nanoparticles effectively shift the Fermi level of the photocatalyst, enhancing the distribution of the electron charge. Therefore, the lifetime of the radicals and anions is extended, so the implementation of the active metal nanoparticles has greatly improved photocatalytic efficiency.

== Metal-Organic Framework (MOF) based Micromotors ==
Metal–organic frameworks (MOFs) are a class of compounds that are composed of a metal ion cluster coordinated to an organic linker. These compounds can form 1D, 2D and 3D structures. They possess a porous morphology which can be tuned in terms of shape and size depending on the metal ion and organic linker used to form the MOF. These pores grants them great catalytic properties which is why MOF research focused on the catalytic degradation of contaminants for environmental remediation has been gaining more attention. The major limitation of MOFs is that they tend to settle at the bottom of the solution, reducing their effectiveness since they are not coming into contact with the contaminant. Thus, in the past years more and more research focused on MOF for catalytic degradation have been implementing micromotors. The MOF particles are half-coated with a metal, creating a Janus motor particle (half metal, half MOF). The motor aspect of the particle enhances its diffusion, increasing the probability of the MOF and contaminant encountering each other in solution, thus increasing its degradation rate. These MOF based micromotors have proven to be extremely efficient at decontaminating water, and after the fuel used for propulsion (in most cases hydrogen peroxide) is completely consumed, they settle at the bottom of the solution, facilitating the removal of the Janus motor particles from the solution.
