= IEEE Sensors Letters =

Peer-reviewed scientific journal

- Discipline: Sensors
- Language: English
- Edited by: Andrei Shkel

Publication details
- History: 2017–present
- Publisher: IEEE Sensors Council
- Frequency: Monthly
- Impact factor: 2.2 (2024)
- ISO 4: Find out here

Indexing
- ISSN: 2475-1472
- LCCN: 2016201940
- OCLC no.: 964528307

Links
- Journal homepage; Online archive

The IEEE Sensors Letters is a peer-reviewed scientific journal published by the IEEE Sensors Council, part of the Institute of Electrical and Electronics Engineers.

It focuses on the rapid dissemination of short research articles in the field of sensors and sensing technologies. The journal is published electronically and follows a hybrid open-access model, allowing authors the option to make their work openly accessible for a fee.

== History ==
IEEE Sensors Letters was established in February 2017 as a platform for timely publication of short research contributions in sensor-related disciplines. The journal was developed to accommodate manuscripts that report significant developments requiring expedited review and dissemination. Since its launch, it has maintained a peer-reviewed editorial process and publishes articles exclusively in electronic format.

== Content overview ==
IEEE Sensors Letters publishes short-format articles in the field of sensors and sensing technologies. The journal's scope includes topics such as the theory, design, fabrication, manufacturing, signal processing, interface circuits, and applications of devices for detecting and transducing physical, chemical, and biological phenomena. Submissions are limited to four pages in length, with a requirement that at least one column of each paper be allocated to references.

The journal presents the IEEE Sensors Letters Best Paper and Runner Up Award annually. These recognitions are given to papers published in the previous calendar year and are evaluated based on criteria such as scientific quality, originality, relevance to the field, and timeliness. The Best Paper Award includes a certificate and a cash prize of $2,000, distributed among the authors, while the Runner Up Award includes a certificate.

IEEE Sensors Letters is indexed in several bibliographic databases, including Scopus, Web of Science, and IEEE Xplore. According to the Journal Citation Reports released in June 2025, the journal's 2024 metrics include an Impact Factor of 2.2, an Eigenfactor score of 0.00343, an Article Influence Score of 0.422, and a CiteScore of 3.3.

== Journal leadership ==
| Editor-in-Chief | Start date | End date |
|---|---|---|
| Srinivas Tadigadapa, Northeastern University, Boston, MA, USA | 2017 | 2022 |
| Andrei Shkel, University of California, Irvine, USA | 2023 | Present |

== See also ==
- IEEE Sensors Journal
- IEEE Sensors Magazine
