= Intravesical drug delivery =

Drug delivery to the bladder

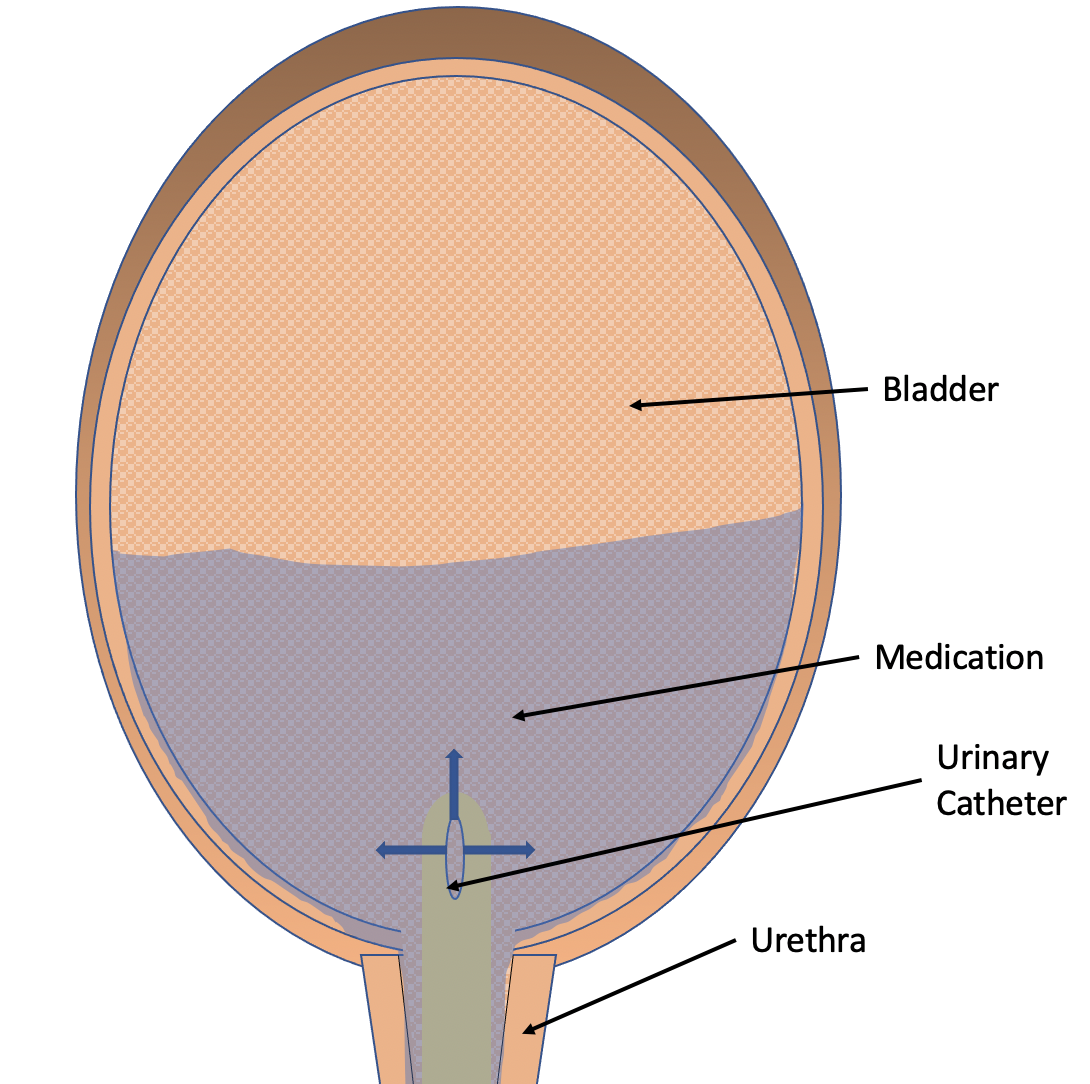
Intravesical drug delivery through a urinary catheter

Intravesical drug delivery is the delivery of medications directly into the bladder by urinary catheter. This method of drug delivery is used to directly target diseases of the bladder such as interstitial cystitis and bladder cancer, but currently faces obstacles such as low drug retention time due to washing out with urine and issues with the low permeability of the bladder wall itself. Due to the advantages of directly targeting the bladder, as well as the effectiveness of permeability enhancers, advances in intravesical drug carriers, and mucoadhesive, intravesical drug delivery is becoming more effective and of increased interest in the medical community.

== Advantages ==
Delivering drugs directly to the target bladder site allows for maximizing drug delivery while minimizing systemic effects. Delivering the treatment directly to the site allows for more effective dosages to be given since high concentrations of drug in the bladder can be reached. This becomes especially important when patients have a urinary bladder disease that is drug resistant. The delivery of drugs directly to the bladder is a large improvement over systemic delivery which only allows a small fraction of the drug to reach the bladder, causing lower concentrations of drug leading to systemic treatments being ineffective. The smaller fraction of drug reaching its target with systemic delivery means more drugs must be administered which can lead to problems with systemic toxicity. This is not the case when drug is administered directly to the bladder.

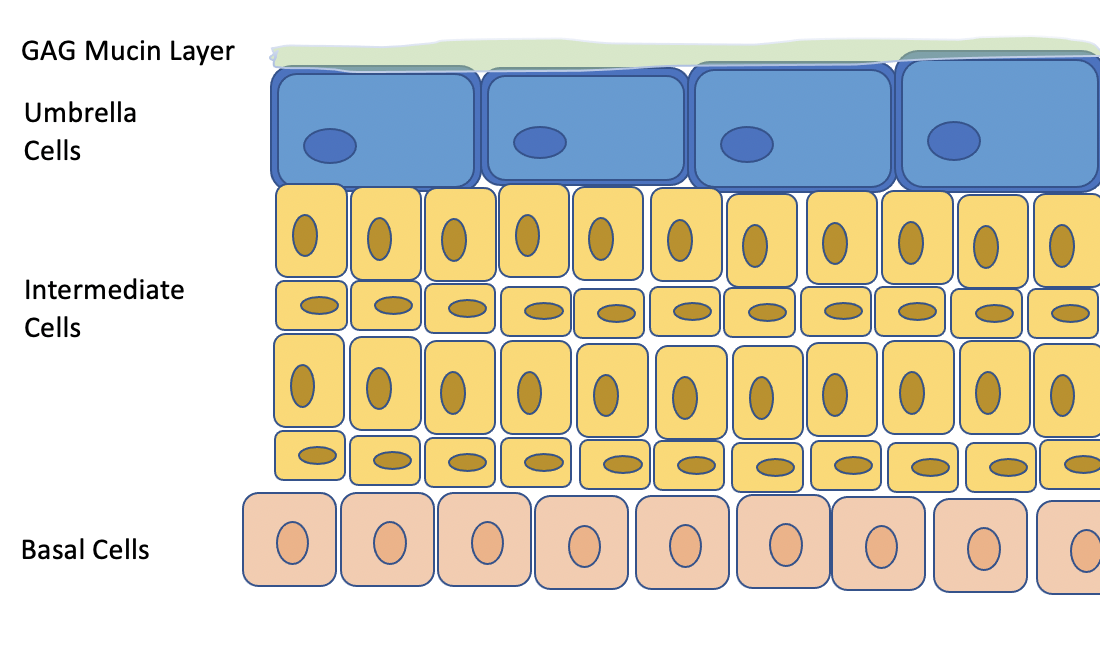
The layers of the urothelium.

The layer of the bladder which comes into contact with urine, the urothelium (the transitional epithelium of the bladder, is a mostly impermeable barrier which stops molecules in the urine from being reabsorbed and prevents molecules from being secreted directly into the bladder as well. The bladder's impermeability means that any drug delivered intravesical will not absorb into the bloodstream well through the bladder wall, causing fewer systemic effects. This impermeability also causes treatment of bladder diseases to be more difficult to treat as drugs do not absorb well into the bladder wall. Intravesical drug delivery has been identified as an ideal way to treat most urinary disorders, including bladder tumors and bladder cancers, interstitial cystitis, and urinary incontinence. There is currently a lack of interest in treating urinary tract infections using intravesical delivery.

== Disadvantages ==
While intravesical delivery shows distinct advantages over systemic drug delivery it has several problems to overcome. When giving a drug intravesically it is diluted by urine and washed out when urine is voided. Additionally, the low permeability of the urothelium which lines the bladder creates a hurdle that must be overcome if the bladder wall needs to be treated. These issues create the need for more frequent dosing, which causes urinary catheter site irritation and compliance issues with treatments. Intravesical drug dilution occurs as urine accumulates in the bladder, lowering the concentration of drug in the bladder as overall volume increases. The voiding of drug with urine when using traditional drug formulations in the bladder has become a hurdle to overcome as well, since residence time of the drug inside the bladder is directly tied to the treatment's efficacy. Creating formulations which adhere to the bladder wall has been targeted as one way to improve intravesical dug efficacy,. The low adherence of drugs to the bladder wall and low permeability into the bladder wall contributes to low drug retention in the bladder. When modifying drug formulations for intravesical delivery gels or viscosity increasing formulations are sometimes used to increase retention, though this can cause issues with urethra obstruction, an additional hurdle in intravesical drug delivery. Permeability issues with the bladder wall can be attributed to the urothelium, the lining of the bladder wall made up of umbrella cells, intermediate cells, and basal cells.,. The impermeability can be attributed to the umbrella cells which form tight junctions with each other to make up the innermost layer of the urothelium and have the ability to change shape to adapt to the bladder's varying size. The umbrella cells are covered in a dense layer of plaques which further prevents the absorption of particles through the urothelium and a layer of mucin composed of glycosaminoglycans (GAGs) which prevents both hydrophobic and negatively charged molecules from adhering to the bladder wall. Overcoming the impermeability of the mucin layer and the urothelium is a large focus of many intravesical drug formulations, and is key to an efficacious intravesical treatment

== Improvements ==
The main ways researchers are currently overcoming the problems in intravesical drug delivery are through developing formulations using mucoadhesives, nanoparticles, liposomes, polymeric hydrogel, expandable delivery devices, and electromotive drug administration. These methods each serve to improve retention time, drug permeability through the urothelium, or some combination of the two.

=== Enhancing drug retention ===
Enhancing drug retention can be achieved through changing formulation and delivery device. Often drug retention and permeability enhancement are tied, as drugs which permeate the urothelium will suffer fewer effects from urine dilution and voiding. Two of the most common methods to improve drug retention are by using a mucoadhesive formulation or using polymeric hydrogels that form in the bladder, or in situ gelling hydrogels.

==== Mucoadhesive formulations ====
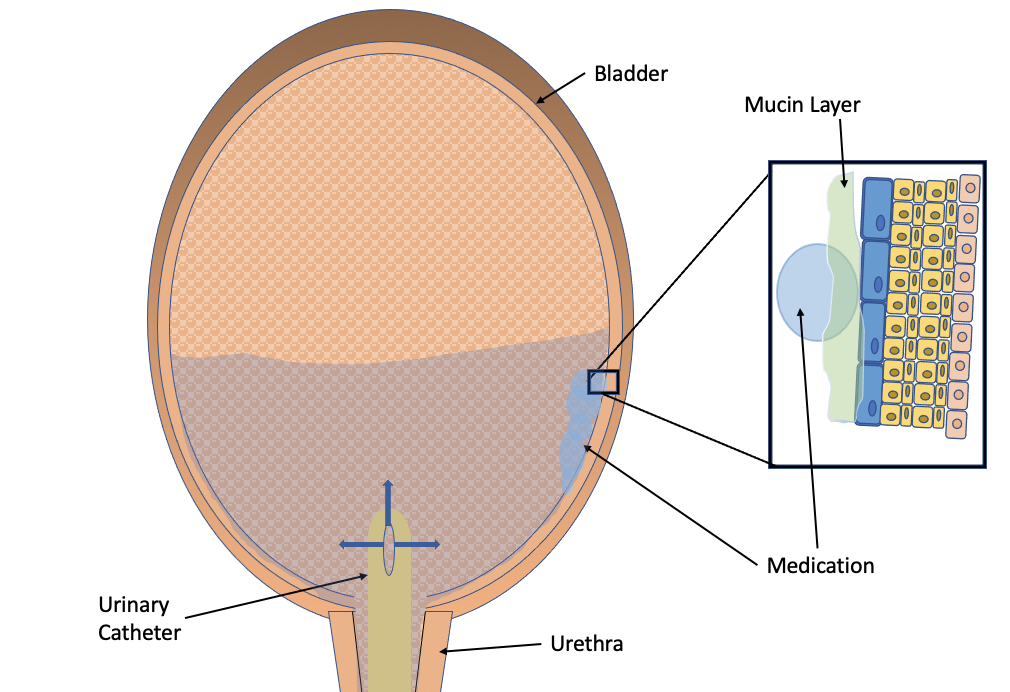
A mucoadhesive formulation adhered to bladder wall through interactions with urothelium's mucin layer.

Mucoadhesive formulations can be made with both biopolymers and synthetic polymers, and usually contain polymers that are hydrophilic and can form many hydrogen bonds with the GAG-mucin. Positively charged molecules typically make far better mucoadhesive as the mucin layer is negatively charged. By forming these bonds, the mucoadhesive, and the drug it carries, can maintain sustained contact with the bladder wall, enhancing retention of the drug in the bladder. Among mucoadhesive materials Chitosan often stands out due to its biocompatibility, biodegradability, and permeability enhancing factors. In experiments with chitosan, it has been shown that the mucoadhesive properties of a molecule likely increase as the molecular weight is increased. Studies have also found that the modification of chitosan formulations with thiomers, which can form covalent bonds with mucus, can significantly improve the mucoadhesion of the chitosan formulations

==== In situ gelling polymeric hydrogels ====
Polymeric hydrogels for intravesical drug delivery take advantage of characteristics of the bladder or urine to gel, or may use external manipulation to cause the hydrogel to form. These gels can take advantage of pH or temperature differences, or external input like UV lasers, to form gels inside the bladder after instillation of the formulation in liquid form. If these gels are made to be mucoadhesive they stick to the bladder wall and do not wash out or cause urethral obstruction. Polymeric hydrogels have also been formulated to float on top of the urine to avoid wash out and obstruction without having to adhere to the bladder wall. Drawbacks of using polymeric hydrogel formulations include the concern of urethral obstruction, the varying conditions of the urine which make pH or ionic controlled gelling formulations less controlled, and the bladder wall inflammation which can occur with mucoadhesive polymeric hydrogels.

=== Enhancing drug permeability ===
Enhancing drug permeability can be done through physical or chemical methods, and is also achieved through nanoparticle and liposome drug carriers. Physical methods include electromotive drug administration, radiofrequency-induced chemotherapeutic effect, and conductive hyperthermic chemotherapy, but electromotive drug administration seems to be the most prevalent in recent research and clinical trial focus. Chemical methods revolve around adding a chemical agent to enhance drug uptake and increase permeability. To enhance drug permeability through physical or chemical methods both the mucin layer and the umbrella cells of the urothelium must undergo a structural or chemical change.

==== Electromotive Drug Administration (EMDA) ====
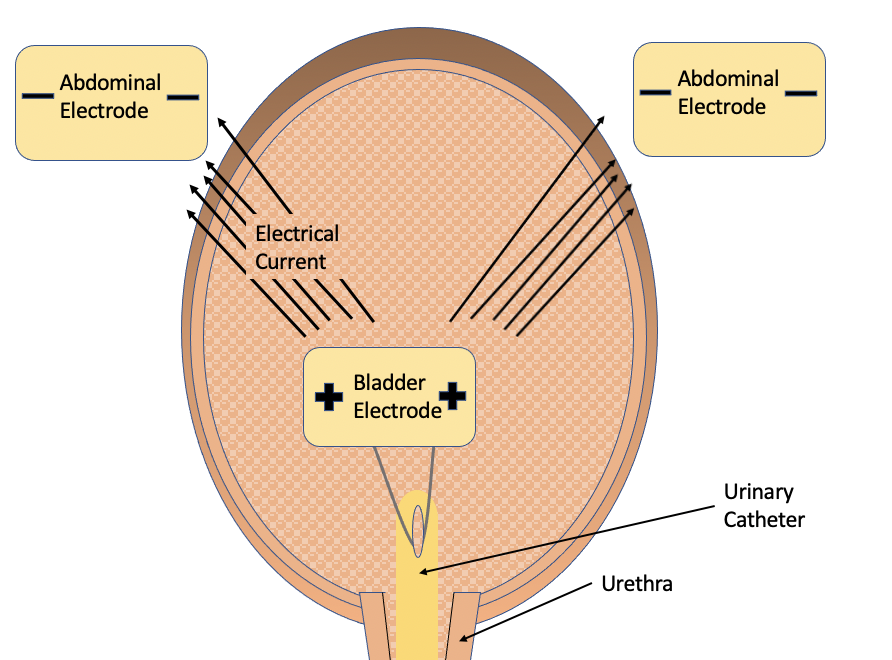
Placement of electrodes for EMDA on the urinary bladder.

Electromotive drug administration utilizes a small electric current flowing across the bladder wall between two electrodes, one on the skin and one placed inside the bladder via catheterization, to enhance permeability of aqueous solutions. Electromotive drug administration best enhances ionized formulations, which diffuse poorly using standard passive diffusion. This allows it to potentially assist in the delivery of many drugs that usually perform poorly in the bladder without having to change their formulations heavily. Across multiple studies and clinical trials electromotive drug administration has been shown to increase the uptake of many drugs, showing potential use in bladder cancer, urinary incontinence, urinary cystitis and pain management. Cost of local anesthesia for bladder distention using electromotive drug administration in combination with lidocaine has been shown to be cheaper and more practical than general anesthesia or spinal anesthesia.

==== Chemically enhancing permeability ====
To enhance the permeability of the bladder wall, specifically the urothelium, to drugs administered locally to the bladder four chemical agents are most commonly used: DMSO, protamine sulphate, Hyaluronidase, and chitosan. DMSO is already widely used to directly treat urinary cystitis due to its anti-inflammatory and antibacterial properties. DMSO can penetrate tissues without causing any damage to them. This property of DMSO made it of particular interest as a chemical enhancer and it has been shown to increase the uptake of several chemotherapeutics used intravesically. Protamine sulphate causes disruption to the mucus layer of the urothelium and can cause large disruption of bladder permeability which can be modified by adding defibrotide. Hyaluronidase breaks down Hyaluronic acid, a GAG molecule important to the mucin layer, causing enhanced permeability of the mucin layer to drugs administered concurrently with hyaluronidase. Conversely, hyaluronic acid can be used to treat interstitial cystitis as it helps to repair damaged mucin layers. Chitosan is thought to function as a permeability enhancer by binding to the mucin layer and negatively affecting tight junctions between umbrella cells in the urothelium. It has been shown that chitosan increases bladder wall permeability but its effectiveness as a permeability enhancer decreases as calcium ion concentration increases. Chemically enhancing bladder permeability can lead to negative side effects such as incontinence, pain, and uncontrolled leakage of molecules other than intended drug from the urine into the bladder wall.

==== Nanoparticle and liposome drug carriers ====
Nanoparticle and liposome drug carrier formulations allow for increased drug uptake, especially in the case of liposomes which allow for greater uptake via endocytosis. Liposomes generally must be shielded via modification with a Polyethylene glycol molecule to overcome issues with instability and aggregation in urine. Nanoparticle and Liposome drug carriers can be loaded into a in situ forming hydrogel to gain the advantages of mucoadhesive properties Empty liposomes by themselves have been noted to improve interstitial cystitis, most likely due to formation of a lipid film on damaged urothelium. The variety of types of nanoparticles which can be made to carry drugs in intravesical formulations, combined with the tunability of many of these particles in regards to drug loading and release rates makes nanoparticles and liposomes a highly versatile and useful tool in intravesical drug delivery.
