= Andreas Bernkop-Schnürch =

Austrian university teacher (born 1965)

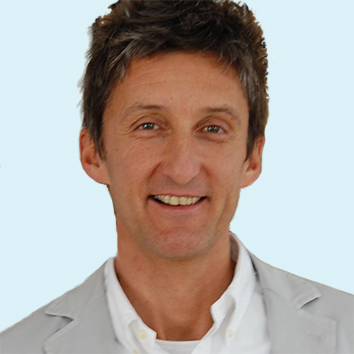
- Born: 6 December 1965 (age 60); Klagenfurt, Austria
- Education: University of Vienna
- Known for: Thiomers, thiolated cyclodextrins, peptide drug delivery, multifunctional polymers, charge-converting nanocarriers, self-emulsifying drug delivery systems
- Awards: Eurand Award (2000), Phoenix Science Award for Pharmacy (2005), Houska Award (2007), Austrian Nano Award (2008), Ernst Brandl Award (2015), Gattefossé North America Award (2017), Phoenix Science Award for Pharmacy (2022), Tyrolean Award for Science (2023)
- Scientific career
- Fields: Pharmaceutical sciences, drug delivery, nanotechnology, biomedical engineering, tissue engineering
- Workplaces: University of Innsbruck, Institute of Pharmacy

Andreas Bernkop-Schnürch (born 6 December 1965) is an Austrian pharmaceutical scientist and academic. He is Professor of Pharmaceutical Technology and head of the Department of Pharmaceutical Technology at the Institute of Pharmacy, University of Innsbruck.

His research focuses on drug delivery systems, dosage forms, controlled release mechanisms, nanobiotechnology, polymer engineering, and tissue engineering. He is the inventor of several technologies, including thiolated polymers, which he named thiomers in 2000, and phosphatase-triggered charge-converting nanoparticles designed for mucosal drug delivery.

Since 2014, Bernkop-Schnürch has been a member of the Scientific Advisory Board for Denmark's Nicotine Science Center. From 2016 to 2018, he served on the Scientific Committee of the Innovative Medicines Initiative (IMI) of the European Union, contributing to the Strategic Research Agenda for Horizon 2020 by advising on scientific priorities.

As an entrepreneur, he founded multiple companies, including Thiomatrix Forschungs und Beratungs, Mucobiomer Biotechnologische Forschungs und Entwicklungs (now part of Croma-Pharma), and Green River Polymers Forschungs und Entwicklungs.

== Biography ==
Andreas Bernkop-Schnürch was born into a family of pharmacists in Austria. He pursued studies in pharmacy, microbiology, and genetics at the University of Vienna, where he earned his doctorate in 1994. From 1994 to 1999, he served as a postdoctoral fellow at the Institute of Pharmacy at the University of Vienna. In 1999, he completed his habilitation in pharmaceutical technology, receiving the venia docendi qualification. Since 2003, he has been Chair of the Pharmaceutical Technology Department at the University of Innsbruck. From 2006 to 2013, he served as Dean of the Faculty of Chemistry and Pharmacy. In 2022, he was appointed as a visiting professor at the University of Bari Aldo Moro. Since 2021, Bernkop-Schnürch has been a member of the University of Innsbruck Senate.

== Research ==
Bernkop-Schnürch’s research has focused on drug delivery systems, multi-functional polymers, and tissue engineering. He is a leading pioneer of thiolated polymers, known as thiomers, a class of bio- and mucoadhesive polymers that form disulfide bonds with cysteine-rich domains of endogenous proteins, including mucus glycoproteins and keratins. Several thiomer-based medicines have successfully completed clinical trials, with initial products targeting conditions such as dry eye syndrome now available on the global pharmaceutical market. In 2001, at the 4th Central European Symposium on Pharmaceutical Technology in Vienna, he introduced thiolated polysaccharides as novel biopolymers for tissue engineering. This development led to numerous products incorporating thiomers, such as thiolated chitosans and thiolated hyaluronic acid, which are widely used in pharmaceutics and biomedicine. His work on thiomer technology also enabled the creation of thiolated nanoparticles utilized in drug delivery, diagnostics, and biosensors. Among the smallest thiolated nanocarriers are thiolated cyclodextrins, introduced in 2015. These nanocarriers have been reported to provide extended residence time on mucosal membranes, enhanced permeation, efflux pump inhibition, and improved cellular uptake. Additionally, Bernkop-Schnürch developed charge-converting nanoparticles for mucosal drug delivery, leveraging the membrane-bound enzyme alkaline phosphatase to trigger a change in zeta potential from negative to positive directly at the epithelium. This approach was proposed as a means of addressing limitations associated with the polycation dilemma, wherein cationic nanoparticles—despite superior cellular uptake—are immobilized in mucus due to ionic interactions. Charge-converting nanoparticles overcome this barrier by altering their surface charge at the cellular interface. He also advanced foundational research in self-emulsifying drug delivery systems (SEDDS), optimizing them for the mucosal delivery of macromolecular drugs, further enhancing the potential for improved therapeutic outcomes.

== Editorial boards ==
Bernkop-Schnürch serves on the editorial boards of several pharmaceutical journals, including the International Journal of Pharmaceutics, the Journal of Drug Delivery Science and Technology, the Journal of Controlled Release, Scientia Pharmaceutica, Drug Development and Industrial Pharmacy, and the European Journal of Pharmaceutics and Biopharmaceutics.

== Awards ==
Bernkop-Schnürch has received a number of scientific awards. These honours include:

- Research-Award of the City of Vienna 1999
- Eurand-Award 2000
- Best of Biotech Award 2001
- MBPW Award 2002
- Best of Biotech Award 2003
- Adventure X Award 2004
- Most Cited Paper Awards 2004
- Phoenix Science Award for Pharmacy 2005
- Eurand Award 2007
- Austrian Nano Award 2008
- Ernst Brandl Award 2015
- Most Cited Paper Award 2017
- Gattefossé North America Award for Excellence in Research & Development with Lipid Excipients 2017
- Phoenix Science Award for Pharmacy 2022
- Tyrolean Award for Science 2023

== Selected works ==
Bernkop-Schnürch is the author of over 500 research articles and reviews. He has also served as editor and (co-)author of multiple books in the field of pharmaceutical sciences.

- Asim, MH; Ijaz, M; Rösch, AC; Bernkop-Schnürch, A (2020). "Thiolated cyclodextrins: New perspectives for old excipients". Coordination Chemistry Reviews. 420 213433. doi:10.1016/j.ccr.2020.213433.
- Leichner, C; Jelkmann, M; Bernkop-Schnürch, A (2019). "Thiolated polymers: Bioinspired polymers utilizing one of the most important bridging structures in nature". Advanced Drug Delivery Reviews. 151–152: 191–221. doi:10.1016/j.addr.2019.04.007. PMID 31028759. S2CID 135464452.
- Federer, C; Kurpiers, M; Bernkop-Schnürch, A (2021). "Thiolated Chitosans: A Multi-talented Class of Polymers for Various Applications". Biomacromolecules. 22 (1): 24–56. doi:10.1021/acs.biomac.0c00663. PMC 7805012. PMID 32567846.
- Griesser, J; Hetényi, G; Bernkop-Schnürch, A (2018). "Thiolated Hyaluronic Acid as Versatile Mucoadhesive Polymer: From the Chemistry Behind to Product Developments-What Are the Capabilities?". Polymers. 10 (3): 243. doi:10.3390/polym10030243. PMC 6414859. PMID 30966278.
- Hock, N; Racaniello, GF; Aspinall, S; Denora, N; Khutoryanskiy, V; Bernkop-Schnürch, A (2022). "Thiolated Nanoparticles for Biomedical Applications: Mimicking the Workhorses of our Body". Advanced Science. 9 (1) 2102451. Bibcode:2022AdvSc...902451H. doi:10.1002/advs.202102451. PMC 8728822. PMID 34773391.
- Grassiri, B; Zambito, Y; Bernkop-Schnürch, A (2021). "Strategies to prolong the residence time of drug delivery systems on ocular surface". Advances in Colloid and Interface Science. 288 102342. doi:10.1016/j.cis.2020.102342. hdl:11568/1076839. PMID 33444845. S2CID 230584233.
- Summonte, S; Racaniello, GF; Lopedota, A; Denora, N; Bernkop-Schnürch, A (2021). "Thiolated polymeric hydrogels for biomedical application: Cross-linking mechanisms". Journal of Controlled Release. 330: 470–482. doi:10.1016/j.jconrel.2020.12.037. hdl:11586/351487. PMID 33359581. S2CID 229694027.
- Kali, G; Knoll, P; Bernkop-Schnürch, A (2022). "Emerging technologies to increase gastrointestinal transit times of drug delivery systems". Journal of Controlled Release. 346: 289–299. doi:10.1016/j.jconrel.2022.04.016. PMID 35461970.
- Noreen, S; Bernkop-Schnürch, A (2023). "Thiolated poly- and oligosaccharide-based hydrogels for tissue engineering and wound healing". Advanced Functional Materials. 34 (4) 2310129. doi:10.1002/adfm.202310129.
