= List of medical abbreviations: X =

Abbreviation	Meaning
x̄	(x with macron) except
X-AFP	extended alpha-fetoprotein
XR	extended release (see time release technology) x-ray (see radiography)
XRT	radiotherapy used in cancer treatment
