= Cervical drug delivery =

Drug delivery methodology

Female anatomy - cervix and vagina

Cervical drug delivery is a route of carrying drugs into the body through the vagina and cervix. This is a form of localized drug delivery that prevents the drugs from impacting unintended areas of the body, which can lower side effects of toxic drugs such as chemotherapeutics. Cervical drug delivery has specific applications for a variety of female health issues: treatment of cervical cancer, pregnancy prevention, STD prevention, and STD treatment.

== Biological considerations ==
=== Cervical mucus ===
Menstrual Cycle, demonstrating hormone levels at different phases, which affect viscosity of cervical mucus

Viscous mucus secreted by glands in the cervix presents a unique environment for drug delivery. Due to its ability to retain substances and slowly release them, it holds potential to be used as a natural, noninvasive drug delivery system. The mucus can act as a reservoir for compounds that destroy pathogens. However, the cervical mucus also presents a barrier to drug delivery as it can be really thick, making it difficult to permeate the mucus barrier. The mechanisms for penetration and bioactivity of the cervical mucus must be understood to utilize the mucus’s potential as a drug delivery system. Due to the changes in viscosity and water content of the mucus during the stages of the menstrual cycle, this poses a particularly complex consideration. For example, the cervical mucus will be thicker when a woman is not ovulating in order to prevent sperm from being able to penetrate the mucus barrier, which also in turn makes in more difficult for penetration of drug delivery systems.

=== Vaginal pH levels ===
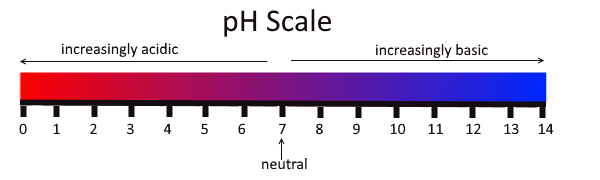
PH Scale showing 3.8-4.5 in the acidic range.

The vaginal environment is slightly acidic, with pH ranging from 3.8 - 4.5 based on multiple factors such as age, natural bacteria, and stage of menstrual cycle. Due to the variety in possible pH values, this poses an interesting consideration for drug delivery. Absorption and release of drugs is often influenced by pH, so if the pH is changing through the menstrual cycle, different combinations could be needed at different times to achieve the most effective drug delivery system.

== Applications ==
=== Birth control ===
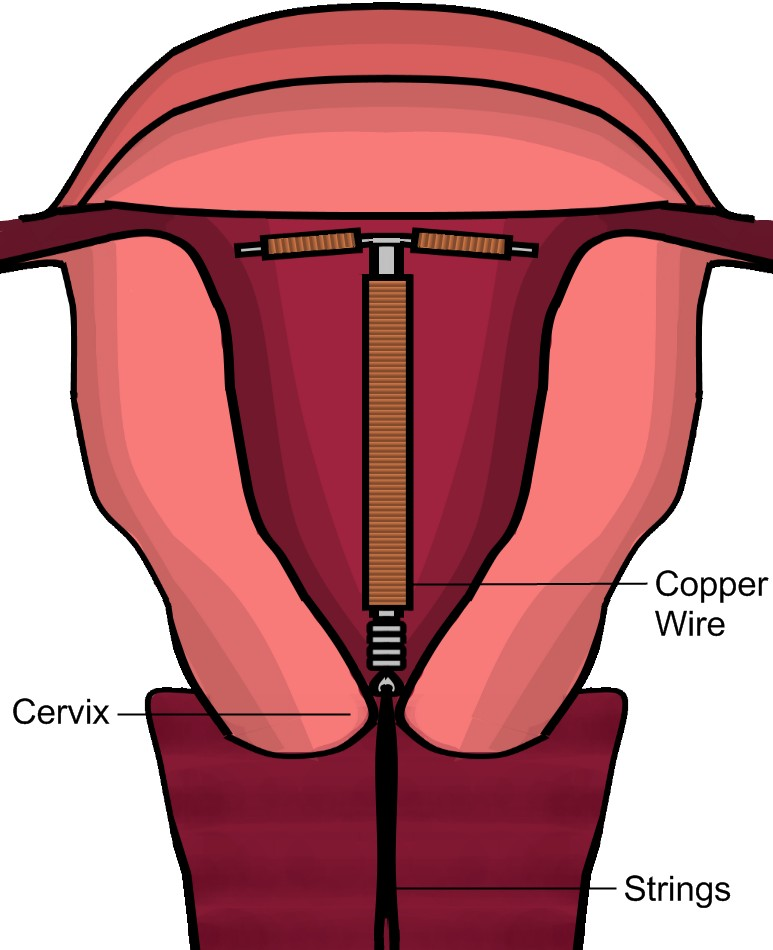
Diagram of copper IUD in uterus

Some hormonal birth control methods utilize cervical drug delivery methods. The earliest example of such dates to 1850 Ancient Egypt when acadia gum was inserted into the vagina, releasing spermicidal components. Examples in the modern era include vaginal rings and intrauterine devices (IUDs) that release hormones into the reproductive system to prevent fertilization. Vaginal rings are plastic ring-shaped devices that are inserted into the vaginal canal and slowly release hormones such as estradiol or progestin. Hormonal IUDs are T-shaped devices inserted into the uterus, releasing progestin over extended periods of time. These hormones work to thicken the cervical mucus to prevent sperm from penetrating and reaching the fallopian tubes. Copper IUDs are another form of intrauterine devices that release copper ions instead of hormones. The copper ions are toxic to sperm and therefore prevents successful fertilization.

=== Cervical cancer treatment ===
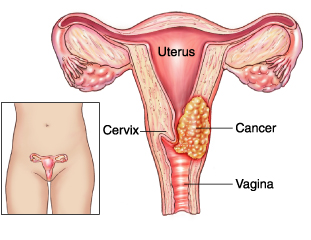
Illustrated diagram of large cervical cancer tumor

The most common application of cervical drug delivery is for treatment of cervical cancer. Due to the direct route provided through the use of cervical drug delivery mechanisms, it proves to be the most effective route with the lowest number of side effects. The localized treatment has been suggested as ideal as cancer is treated with highly toxic compounds, such as chemotherapeutics. The more contained the exposure to these compounds can be, the less negative impacts the patient will endure. Treatment can be delivered in the form of nanoparticles, vaginal gels, or films and reach the cervix quickly for ideal response. Vaginal gels are easily administered into the vaginal canal to reach the cervix due to low viscosity at room temperature. When inserted into the body which has a higher temperature, the gels become more viscous, allowing them to reside longer at the cervix and have more sustained release. Vaginal films are very thin films inserted into the vagina to release a compound. They can be maintained for six hours in cervical mucus, meaning they hold potential to treat cervical cancer caused by Human Papilloma Virus. Nanoparticle systems take advantage of the size of nanoparticles to encapsulate the drugs and pass through the mucus barrier.

=== Sexually transmitted diseases ===
Cervical drug delivery serves as a route for compounds to prevent and treat sexually transmitted diseases (STDs). Prevention of STDs for women can be achieved by administering preventative compounds into the vaginal canal prior to intercourse. One method researched is the use of a CAP technology that remains stable in the vaginal environment, but breaks down in the presence of human semen, releasing a drug to destroy STDs. This application of cervical drug delivery would be useful for prevention of STDs in women without interfering with the bodily environment until there is potential for infection. STDs can also be treated through cervical drug delivery methods. Antibiotics for STD treatment are often administered into the vagina in the form of creams or gels.

=== Fertility treatment ===
Hormones to increase fertility are also often delivered through the cervical route. While this is less common than applications for birth control, it essentially utilizes the same concepts. Hormones influence the natural menstrual cycle, so instead of using hormones that prevent ovulation, hormones are used to encourage ovulation, such as follicle-stimulation hormones (FSH) and luteinizing hormones (LH). Fertility lubricants are the most common example of fertility treatments delivered through the cervical route. These lubricants are designed to mimic a pH and viscosity that is conducive for sperm to reach the fallopian tube. Studies are being done to combine the properties of fertility lubricants with fertility increasing hormones to lead to more direct and efficient treatment.

== Current products ==
=== Vaginal rings ===
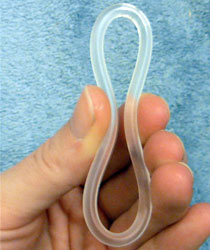
Compressed NuvaRing, a hormonal vaginal ring used for contraception

Vaginal rings are most commonly used for birth control purposes but can also be used to release compounds that treat and prevent STDs as well. The rings come in one standard size that fits most women and are made of flexible materials that contain the desired compound, whether that be hormones for birth control or other compounds for STD treatment. These substances are then slowly released over an extended period of time, typically a month. This is a convenient drug delivery method because they can easily be inserted and removed and do not prohibit intercourse. For birth control purposes, the vaginal ring is removed after 3 week and a new one is inserted a week later. Vaginal rings are also often used to treat symptoms of menopause, and these rings are replaced after a 3 month use. STD prevention and treatment through the use of vaginal rings is a newer application of such a device, but holds an advantage as a low maintenance option for women in areas with less access to regular healthcare.

=== Suppositories ===
Vaginal suppositories are forms of medications that are inserted into the vagina in a solid form, but melt from body heat to release the substances. Common uses for them are to treat yeast or bacterial infections. Hormones are often delivered in this form for treatment of menopausal or menstrual related issues. Spermicide can also be delivered as a suppository when inserted prior to intercourse for birth control purposes. Insertion of vaginal suppositories uses a mechanism and applicator similar to that of a tampon. If there is no applicator available, they can be inserted with two fingers pushing them into the vaginal canal as far as is comfortable.

=== Vaginal gels ===
Vaginal gels are forms of medication that are water-based. They are applied using a plastic applicator to distribute the gel throughout the length of the vaginal canal. These gels tend to have release kinetics that are fast acting, which makes them useful for treatment of irritations. Antibiotics are often distributed in the form of a gel for treatment of common infections, including sexually transmitted infections (STIs). The gels also have the benefit of being lubricating, which grants additional relief to symptoms of dryness and itching that is common with vaginal infections. Gels that are in the form of liposomal structure have been shown to retain substances for extensive periods of time, making them useful for slow release of drugs administered through the cervical drug delivery route

== New technologies ==
=== Vaginal films ===
Vaginal films are soluble, thin sheets of medication that are inserted into the vagina where they dissolve and release the substances. Typical uses include delivery of contraceptive substances or antibiotics for infections. These films are inserted by simply pushing them into the vagina with one’s fingers. There they dissolve quickly upon interaction with natural vaginal fluids.

=== Bioadhesives ===
Bioadhesives are substances that naturally stick to live tissue. Currently, studies are being done on bioadhesives adhering to cervical mucous membranes to allow for an extended release period. The drug would be released with mucus to create a localized treatment with high effectiveness. This is anticipated to be highly useful for treatment of cervical cancer. Bioadhesives can come in multiple forms, such as films, tablets, or gels. The appeal of bioadhesives is that they take advantage of the mucous environment surrounding the cervix and utilize it to benefit the drug delivery mechanism.
