= Nanocomposite hydrogels =

Nanocomposite hydrogels (NC gels) are nanomaterial-filled, hydrated, polymeric networks that exhibit higher elasticity and strength relative to traditionally made hydrogels. A range of natural and synthetic polymers are used to design nanocomposite network. By controlling the interactions between nanoparticles and polymer chains, a range of physical, chemical, and biological properties can be engineered. The combination of organic (polymer) and inorganic (clay) structure gives these hydrogels improved physical, chemical, electrical, biological, and swelling/de-swelling properties that cannot be achieved by either material alone. Inspired by flexible biological tissues, researchers incorporate carbon-based, polymeric, ceramic and/or metallic nanomaterials to give these hydrogels superior characteristics like optical properties and stimulus-sensitivity which can potentially be very helpful to medical (especially drug delivery and stem cell engineering) and mechanical fields.

Nanocomposite hydrogels are not to be confused with nanogel, a nanoparticle composed of a hydrogel.

== Synthesis ==
The synthesis of nanocomposite hydrogels is a process that requires specific material and method. These polymers need to be made up of equally spaced out, 30 nm in diameter, clay platelets that can swell and exfoliate in the presence of water. The platelets act as cross-links to modify molecular functions to enable the hydrogels to have superior elasticity and toughness that resembles closely that of biological tissue. Using clay platelets that do not swell or exfoliate in water, using an organic cross-linker such as N,N-methylenebisacrylamide(BIS), mixing of clay and BIS, or preparing nanocomposite hydrogels in a method other than cross-link, will be unsuccessful.

Despite all the specifications, the process of synthesizing nanocomposite hydrogels is simple and because of the flexible nature of the material, these hydrogels can be easily made to come in different shapes such as huge blocks, sheets, thin films, rods, hollow tubes, spheres, bellows and uneven sheets.

== Properties ==
=== Mechanical ===
Nanocomposite hydrogels are tough, and can withstand stretching, bending, knotting, crushing, and other modifications.

==== Tensile ====
Tensile testings were performed on nanocomposite hydrogels to measure the stress and strain it experiences when elongated under room temperature. The results show that this material can be stretched up to 1000% of its original length.

==== Compression ====
Hysteresis is used to measure the compression properties of nanocomposite hydrogels, which shows that this material can withstand around 90% compression. This data shows that nanocomposite hydrogels exhibit superior strength relative to conventionally-made hydrogels, which would have broken down under less compression.

=== Swelling and stimulus sensitivity ===
==== Swelling, de-swelling ====
The porous network of clay particles enable nanocomposite hydrogels to swell in the presence of water. Swelling (and de-swelling) distinguishes NC gels from conventionally-made hydrogels (OR gels) as it is a property that OR gels lack. The swelling property of NC gels allows them to collect the surrounding aqueous solution instead of being dissolved by it, which helps make them good candidates for drug delivery carriers.

==== Stimulus sensitivity ====
Nanocomposite hydrogels are observed to be temperature sensitive and will change temperature when their surrounding is altered. Inorganic salts, when absorbed, will result in changing the hydrogels to a lower temperature whereas cat-ionic surfactant will shift the temperature the other way. The temperature of these hydrogels are around 40 degrees Celsius, making it a possible candidate for use as biomaterial. The stimulus-sensitivity of hydrogels allow for a responsive release system where the hydrogels can be designed to deliver the drug in response to changes in condition of the body.

== Types ==
=== Via carbon-based nanomaterials ===
Nanocomposite hydrogels that are reinforced with carbon-based nanomaterials are mechanically tough and electrically conductive, which make them suitable for use in biomedicine, tissue engineering, drug delivery, biosensing, etc. The electrical conductivity property of these hydrogels allows them to mimic the characteristics of nerve, muscle, and cardiac tissues. However, even though these nanocomposite hydrogels demonstrate some functions of human tissue in lab environments, more research is needed to ensure their utility as a tissue replacement.

=== Via polymeric nanoparticles ===
Nanocomposite hydrogels incorporated with polymeric nanoparticles are tailored for drug delivery and tissue engineering. The addition of polymeric nanoparticles gives these hydrogels a reinforced polymeric network that is more stiff and has the ability to enclose hydrophilic and hydrophobic drugs along with genes and proteins. The high stress-absorbing property makes them a potential candidate for cartilage tissue engineering.

=== Via inorganic nanoparticles ===
Most inorganic nanoparticles used for nanocomposite hydrogels are already present in and necessary for the body, and thus present no negative impacts on the body. Some of them, like calcium and silicon, help with preventing bone loss and skeletal development. Others, like nanoclays, improve the structural formation and characteristics of hydrogels where they acquire self-healing properties, flame retardant structures, elasticity, super gas-barrier membrane, oil-repellence, etc. The unique properties obtained by incorporating nanocomposite hydrogels with inorganic nanoparticles will let researchers work on improving bone-related tissue engineering.

=== Via metal and metal-oxide nanoparticles ===
The electrical and thermal conductivity and magnetic property of metals enhance the electrical conductivity and antibacterial property of nanocomposite hydrogels when incorporated. The electrical conducting property is necessary for the hydrogels to start forming functional tissues and be used as imaging agents, drug delivery systems, conductive scaffolds, switchable electronics, actuators, and sensors.

== Applications ==
Researchers have been looking for a material that can mimic tissue properties to make the tissue engineering process more effective and less invasive to the human body. The porous, interconnecting network of nanocomposite hydrogels, created through cross-link, enable wastes and nutrients to easily enter and exit the structure, and their elastomeric properties let them acquire the desired anatomical shape without needing prior molding. The porous structure of this material would also make the process of drug delivery easier where the pharmaceutical compounds present in the hydrogel can easily escape and be absorbed by the body. Aside from that, researchers are also looking into incorporating nanocomposite hydrogels with silver nanoparticles for antibacterial applications and microorganism elimination in medical and food packing and water treatment. Hydrogels infused with nanoparticles have a number of biological applications, including: tissue engineering, chemical and biological sensing and drug and gene delivery.

=== Tissue engineering ===
As tissue replacements, nanocomposite hydrogels need to interact with cells and form functional tissues. With the incorporated nanoparticles and nanomaterials, these hydrogels can mimic the physical, chemical, electrical, and biological properties of most native tissue. Each type of nanocomposite hydrogels has its own unique properties that let it mimic certain types of animal tissue.

=== Drug delivery ===
The emergence of nanocomposite hydrogels allow for more site-specific and time-controlled delivery of drugs of different sizes at improved safety and specificity. Depending on the method of inserting drugs into the material, for example, dissolved, encased, or attached, the drug carrier will be named differently: nanoparticles, nanospheres (where the drug is evenly dispersed throughout the polymeric network), or nanocapsules (where the drug is surrounded by a polymer shell structure). The elastomeric nature of this material allows the hydrogels to obtain the shape of the targeted site and thus the hydrogels can be manufactured identically and used on all patients.

Hydrogels are controlled drug delivery agents that can be engineered to have desired properties. Specifically, hydrogels can be designed to release drugs or other agents in response to physical characteristics of the environment like temperature and pH. The responsiveness of hydrogels is a result of their molecular structure and polymer networks.

Hydrogel nanoparticles have a promising future in the drug delivery field. Ideally, drug delivery systems should, “…maximize the efficacy and the safety of the therapeutic agent, delivering an appropriate amount at a suitable rate and to the most appropriate site in the body”. Nanotechnology incorporated within hydrogels has the potential to meet all the requirements of an ideal drug delivery system. Hydrogels have been studied with a variety of nanocomposites including: clay, gold, silver, iron oxide, carbon nanotubes, hydroxyapatite, and tricalcium phosphate.

Nanoparticles, largely due to their size related physical properties, are highly useful as drug delivery agents. They can overcome physiological barriers and reach specific targets. Nanoparticles’ size, surface charge and properties enable them to penetrate biological barriers that most other drug carriers cannot. To become even more specified, nanoparticles can be coated with targeting ligands. The ability of nanoparticles to deliver drugs to specific targets suggests the potential to limit systemic side-effects and immune responses.

The ability of nanoparticles to carry and release drugs is also largely dependent on characteristics which result from the small size and unique surface area to volume ratio of nanoparticles. Nanoparticles can generally carry drugs in two ways: drugs can either be bound to the outside of the nanoparticles or packed within the polymeric matrix of the nanoparticles. Smaller nanoparticles have higher surface area ratios and can thus bind a high quantity of drug, while larger nanoparticles can encapsulate more of the drug within its core. The best method of drug loading is dependent on the structures of the drug to be bound. Also, drug loading can occur as the nanoparticles are produced, or the drugs can be added to pre-existing nanoparticles. The release of drugs, depends largely on the size of the nanoparticle carrying it. Because nanoparticles can be bound to the surface of nanoparticles, which is large relative to the volume of the particles, drugs can be released quickly. In contrast, drugs that are loaded within nanoparticles are released more slowly.

=== Antibacterial applications ===
Silver nanoparticles are inserted into the 3D polymeric networks of nanocomposite hydrogels for applications in antibacterial activity and improvement in electrical conductance. The presence of silver ions either stop the respiratory enzyme from transferring electrons to oxygen molecules during respiration or prevent proteins from reacting with thiol groups (-SH) on bacteria membrane, both result in the death of bacteria and microorganism without damaging mammal cells. The size of these silver nanoparticles need to be small enough to pass through the cell membrane and thus further research is required to manufacture them into appropriate sizes.

=== Concerns ===
Some concerns relating to hydrogels infused with nanoparticles are the chances of either bursting, or of incomplete release of drugs. Although hydrogels infused with nanoparticles are speculated to be quite promising methods of drug, protein, peptide, oligosaccharide, vaccine, and nucleic acid delivery, more studies regarding nanotoxicology and safety are required before clinical applications can be pursued. Further, to avoid accumulation, biodegradable gels and nanoparticles are highly desirable.

== See also ==
- Gel
- Nanomaterials
- Cross-link
