= Nanogel =

Polymer-based, crosslinked hydrogel particle

A nanogel is a polymer-based, crosslinked hydrogel particle on the sub-micron scale. These complex networks of polymers present a unique opportunity in the field of drug delivery at the intersection of nanoparticles and hydrogel synthesis. Nanogels can be natural, synthetic, or a combination of the two and have a high degree of tunability in terms of their size, shape, surface functionalization, and degradation mechanisms. Given these inherent characteristics in addition to their biocompatibility and capacity to encapsulate small drugs and molecules, nanogels are a promising strategy to treat disease and dysfunction by serving as delivery vehicles capable of navigating across challenging physiological barriers within the body. Nanogels are not to be confused with nanogel aerogel, a lightweight thermal insulator, or with nanocomposite hydrogels (NC gels), which are nanomaterial-filled, hydrated, polymeric networks that exhibit higher elasticity and strength relative to traditionally made hydrogels.

== Synthesis ==
The synthesis of nanogels can be achieved using a vast array of different methods. However, two critical steps typically included in each method are polymerization and crosslinking, with physical and chemical crosslinking the most common. These steps can be completed concomitantly or in sequential order depending on the synthesis method and eventual nanogel application. Here, several different synthesis mechanisms are described briefly.

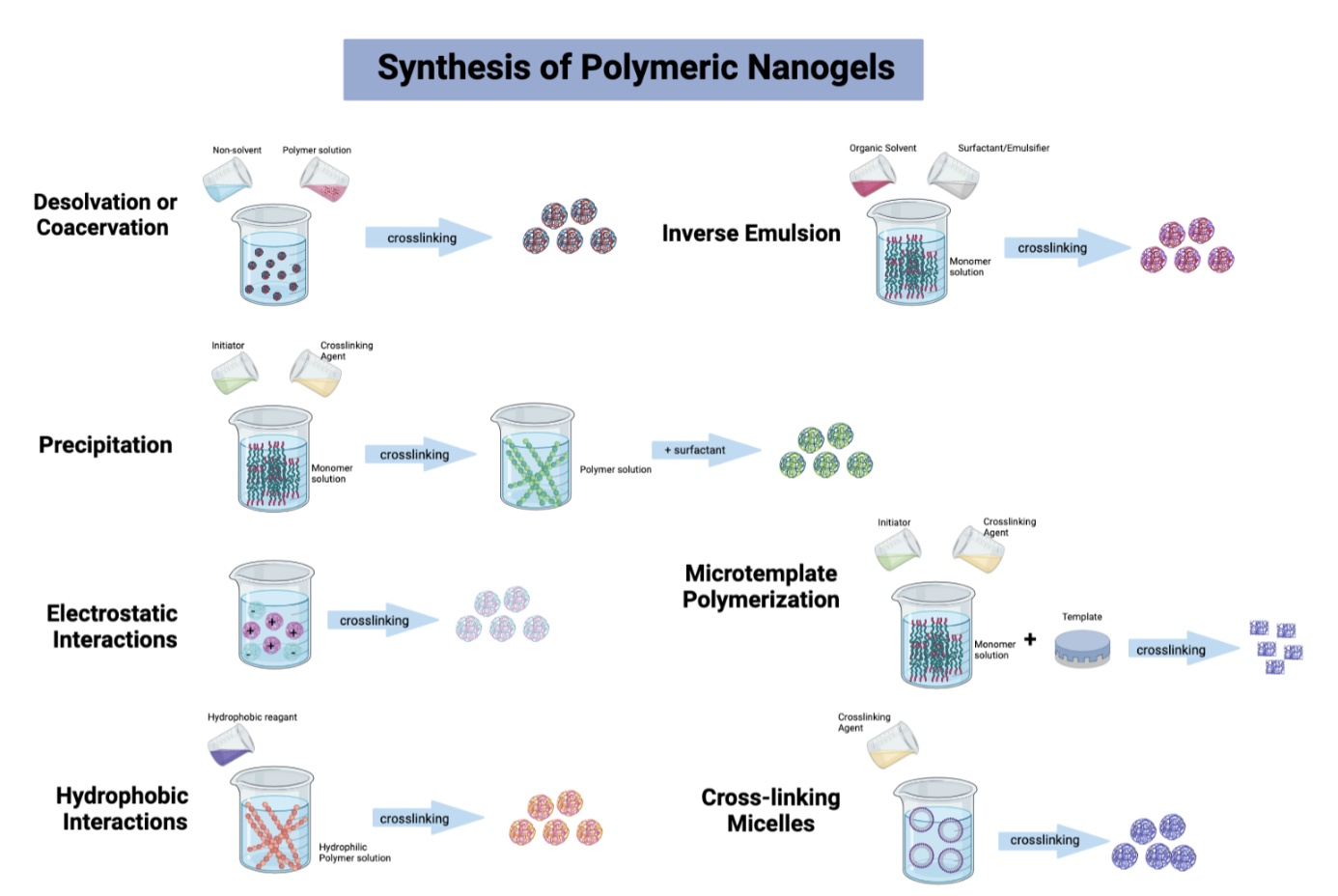
Graphical representation of seven different methods of synthesizing polymeric nanogels.

=== Desolvation/coacervation and precipitation ===
In desolvation or coacervation, a non-solvent is added to a homogeneous polymer solution to produce individual, nanosized polymer complexes dispersed in the same solution. These complexes then undergo crosslinking to form nanogels with surface functionalization an optional next step. In precipitation, initiators and crosslinking agents are added to a homogenous monomer solution to induce a polymerization reaction. When the polymer chain reaches the desired length, the reaction is halted and a polymer colloidal suspension is formed. Surfactants are the final addition to produce nanosized polymers.

=== Electrostatic and hydrophobic interactions ===
Electrostatic interactions can form nanogels through the combination of anionic and cationic polymers in an aqueous solution. The size and surface charge of the resulting nanogels can be modulated by changing the molecular weight or the charge ratio of the two different polymers. Ionotropic gelation can also leverage electrostatic interactions between multivalent anions and cations to form nanogels. Hydrophobic interactions rely heavily on physical crosslinking to form nanogels. In this method, hydrophobic groups are added to hydrophilic polymers in an aqueous solution to induce their self-assembly into nanogels. When thiolated polymers (thiomers) are used for this preparation process, nanogels can be further stabilized by the formation of inter- and intrachain disulfide bonds due to oxidation. In the following the oppositely charged oligo- or polymers can even be removed.

=== Inverse-emulsion ===
Inverse-emulsion, or reverse miniemulsion, requires an organic solvent and a surfactant or emulsifying agent. Nanosized droplets are produced when an aqueous monomer solution is dispersed in the organic solvent in the presence of the surfactant or emulsifying agent. Upon removal of the organic solvent and further chemical and physical crosslinking of the droplets, nanogels are formed. The size of nanogels synthesized using this method can vary greatly depending on the type of surfactant and reaction medium used. Purifying nanogels produced using an emulsifying agent may also pose a challenge.

=== Microtemplate polymerization ===
The addition of a monomer precursor solution and crosslinking agent to a microtemplate, or mold-type device, can initiate polymerization and the formation of nanogels. This method can be used to create nanogels in specific shapes and load them with various small molecules. Lithographic microtemplate polymerization is a similar process that uses a photoinitiator and light to trigger the formation of nanogels. Lithographic microtemplate polymerization can produce smaller nanogels on a length scale of <200 nm, which has a higher resolution compared to microtemplate polymerization that does not require a photoinitiator.

=== Cross-linking micelles ===
Polymer-based micelles that undergo crosslinking reactions can induce the formation of nanogels. Crosslinking either the core or the shell of a preexisting micelles can synthesize nanogels with a "high degree of spatial organization".

== Composition and structure ==
=== Materials ===
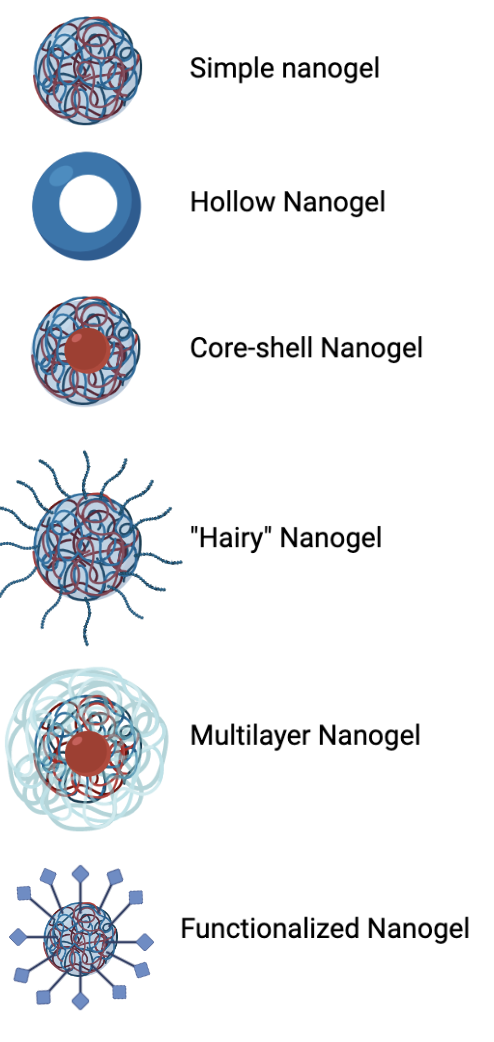
Six different types of nanogels.

Since biodegradability is an important characteristic of nanogels, these hydrogels are typically composed of natural or degradable synthetic polymers. Polysaccharides and proteins largely dominate the natural forms of polymers used to synthesize nanogels. Due to the use of thiolated polysaccharides (thiomers) such as thiolated chitosan or thiolated hyaluronic acid nanogels can be stabilized via intra- and interchain disulfide bonding. Advantages of natural polymer-based nanogels include biocompatibility and degradability by cellular mechanisms in vivo. Natural polymers also tend to be nontoxic and bioactive in which they are more likely to induce biological cues that govern various aspects of cellular behavior. However, natural-based polymers can still cause an immune response and possess other disadvantages such as variable degradation rates and heterogeneous structures. Conversely, synthetic-based polymers have more defined structures, increased stability, and controlled degradation rates. In comparison to natural-based polymers, synthetic polymers lack biological cues that may be necessary for specific therapeutic applications. Given that natural and synthetic polymers are defined by their own set of advantages and disadvantages, an ongoing area of research aims to create composite hydrogels for nanogel synthesis that combines synthetic and natural polymers to leverage the benefits of both in one nanogel formulation.

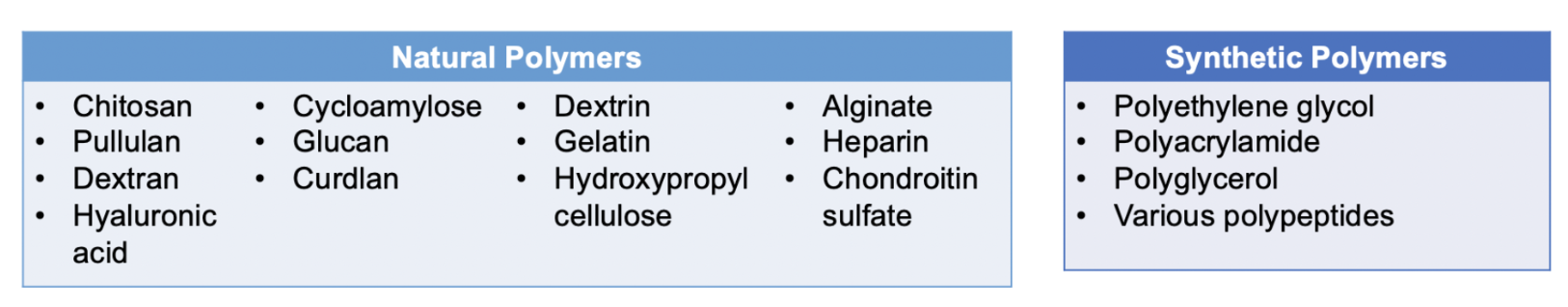
Various types of natural and synthetic biomaterials used to synthesize nanogels.

=== Structure ===
The structure of a nanogel is dependent upon the synthesis mechanism and its application. Simple or traditional nanogels are nanoparticle-sized crosslinked polymer networks that swell in water. Hollow nanogels consisting only of an outer shell can increase the amount of cargo loaded into the platform. In other nanogel structures, the inner core and outer shell can be made of two different materials, such as a hydrophobic inner core to surround drugs or other small molecules and a hydrophilic outer shell that interacts with the external environment. The addition of a second linear monomer crosslinked to a nanogel is deemed a "hairy nanogel". Different nanogel synthesis methods can be completed in sequential order to create multilayered nanogels, such as starting with ionotropic gelation and then combining anionic and cationic polymers in an aqueous solution. Functionalized nanogels, in which targeting ligands or stimuli-sensitive functional groups are conjugated to the outer shell of a nanogel, are also important for certain nanogel applications.

== Stimuli-responsive nanogels ==
Nanogels can be designed to respond to various stimuli including changes in pH and temperature or the presence of redox and light cues. Thoughtfully designed stimuli-responsive nanogels can be leveraged to transport and release different types of cargo to specific tissues within the body with increasing spatiotemporal resolution.

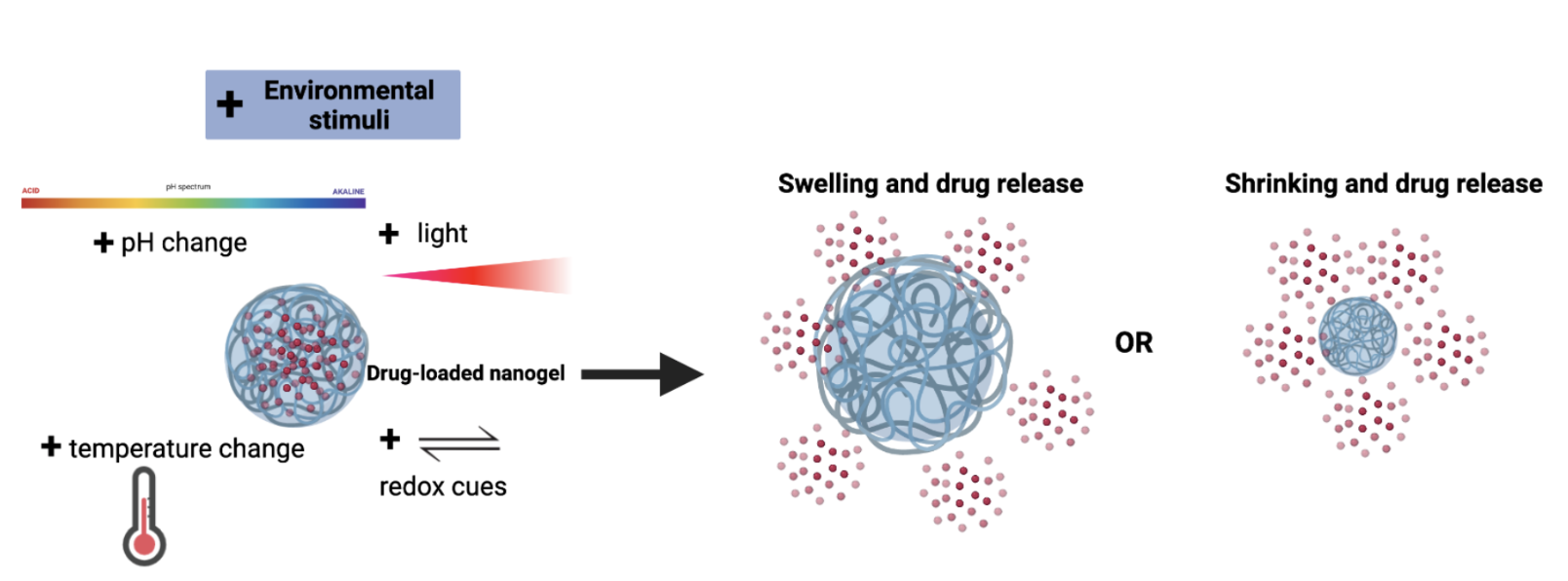
Stimuli-responsive nanogels with different examples of stimuli and two potential release mechanisms.

=== pH-responsive nanogels ===
pH responsive nanogels are an attractive form of nanogel technology due to the different pH levels found within the body. Healthy tissues exhibit a pH of 7.4 whereas tumors can be as low as 6.5 and the stomach as low as 1.0. The protonation or deprotonation of certain functional groups can change the swelling rate and stability of a nanogel, thus resulting in the release of encapsulated cargo when exposed to different pH ranges. For example, anionic nanogels with carboxylic acid groups will collapse upon exposure to a pH that is smaller than the pKa of the nanogel polymer. Similarly, cationic nanogels with terminal amino groups will become protonated if the pH of the environment is less than the pKa of the hydrogel. In this case, the swelling rate of the nanogel will change and it will become more hydrophilic. Other groups have also previously cross-linked pH-responsive hydrazone linkages to polysaccharide-based nanogels that released a payload in an acidic environment.

=== Temperature-responsive nanogels ===
The usage of thermoresponsive polymers in nanogel synthesis allows these systems to respond to changes in temperature. Depending on the chemical groups present, thermoresponsive polymers can either respond to a decrease in temperature or an increase in temperature. Both hydrophobic and hydrophilic groups are typically present in thermoresponsive polymer nanogels that react to temperature decreases, whereas nanogels that respond to temperature increases often have to be prepared by a hydrogen-bonded layering technique. Temperature-responsive nanogels are a potential strategy when a therapeutic is targeting the skin, which has a natural temperature gradient, or a region experiencing inflammation.

=== Redox-responsive nanogels ===
Redox-responsive nanogels generally contain crosslinks formed by disulfide bonds or specific crosslinking agents. Nanogels made of bioreducible and bifunctional monomers can also be used. In the presence of reducing agents such as glutathione, thioredoxin and peroxiredoxin, these nanogels respond by releasing their cargo. Given that these reducing agents and several others are found in larger concentrations inside cells compared to their external environment, redox-responsive nanogels are a promising strategy for targeted intracellular delivery.

=== Light-responsive nanogels ===
Light-responsive nanogels can be triggered to release their cargo with exposure to light at a certain wavelength. These nanogels are synthesized to contain specific acrylic or coumarin-based bonds that cleave during a photoreaction. With the tunability of the wavelength of light, energy, and time of irradiation, light-responsive nanogels can be triggered to degrade with an increased control over crosslinking density. For example, both the swelling and size of light-responsive nanogels with vinyl groups were found to decrease and produce a sustained release of drugs after irradiation with UV light.

== Physiological responses to nanogels ==
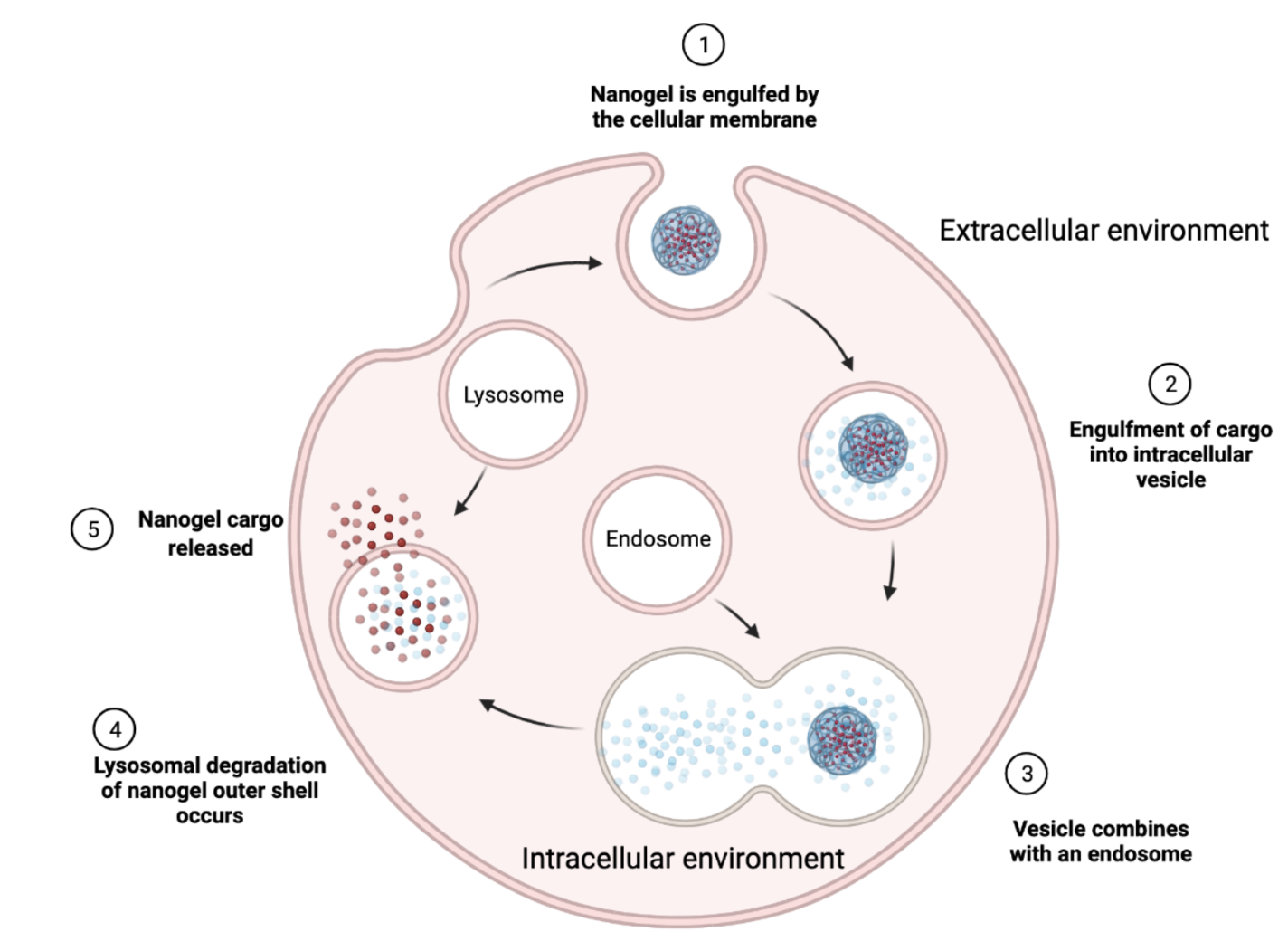
Example of an endocytosis process for a drug-loaded nanogel.

=== Biocompatibility, biodegradability, and biodistribution ===
One major concern with any form of drug delivery system, including nanogels, is potential side effects and damage to healthy tissue in addition to causing a negative immune response with the introduction of a foreign substance. This has to be balanced with the need for nanogels to remain within circulation for an adequate period to deliver cargo and produce a therapeutic effect. To combat a significant immune response, degradable nanogels are the typical default since they are considered less toxic compared to non degradable nanogels. The compliance and small size of degradable nanogels also allows them to travel through blood vessels and reach their target area before consumption by immune cells or filtration by the liver and spleen.

=== Cellular uptake mechanisms ===
After nanogels exit the vasculature, they diffuse through the interstitial space into their target tissue. At the cellular level, nanogels can be internalized by a large number of different types of endocytosis that depend on the particle's size, shape, and surface properties. Endocytosis is the most common mechanism that starts with the nanogels engulfed by the cellular membrane. The nanogels are transported in intracellular vesicles for delivery to endosomes that eventually combine with lysosomes. Once lysosomes are released into the cytosol of a cell, they deliver their cargo immediately or move to the appropriate cellular compartment.

== Applications ==
Potential applications of nanogels include drug delivery agents, contrast agents for medical imaging or 19F MRI tracers, nanoactuators, and sensors.

=== Drug delivery ===
==== Cancer therapeutics ====
In 2022, over 1.9 million new cancer cases are projected in the U.S. alone. Nanogels are an attractive drug delivery solution for increasing both the efficacy of cancer therapeutics and their localization to cancer cells. Nanogels are currently being investigated for the treatment of different types of cancer, of which a few examples are listed here. In one study, chitosan-based nanogels loaded with doxorubicin, a chemotherapeutic, with a positive surface charge demonstrated a lower colorectal cancer cell viability compared to control groups and a similarly loaded nanogel with a negative surface charge. Another group conjugated folic acid to nanogels loaded with cisplatin or doxorubicin and delivered these therapeutics to ovarian cancer cells, which overexpress the folate receptor that binds with folic acid. These conjugated nanogels produced a significant decrease in tumor growth in a mouse model compared to vehicle controls and showed a site-specific delivery model for nanogels that may be effective for other types of cancer with upregulated folate receptors. Interestingly, gelatin-based nanogels loaded with cisplatin and conjugated to epidermal growth factor receptor (EGFR) ligands have been reported to successfully target lung cancer cells both in vitro and in vivo, with additional work confirming the effectiveness of these nanogels when transformed into aerosol particles.

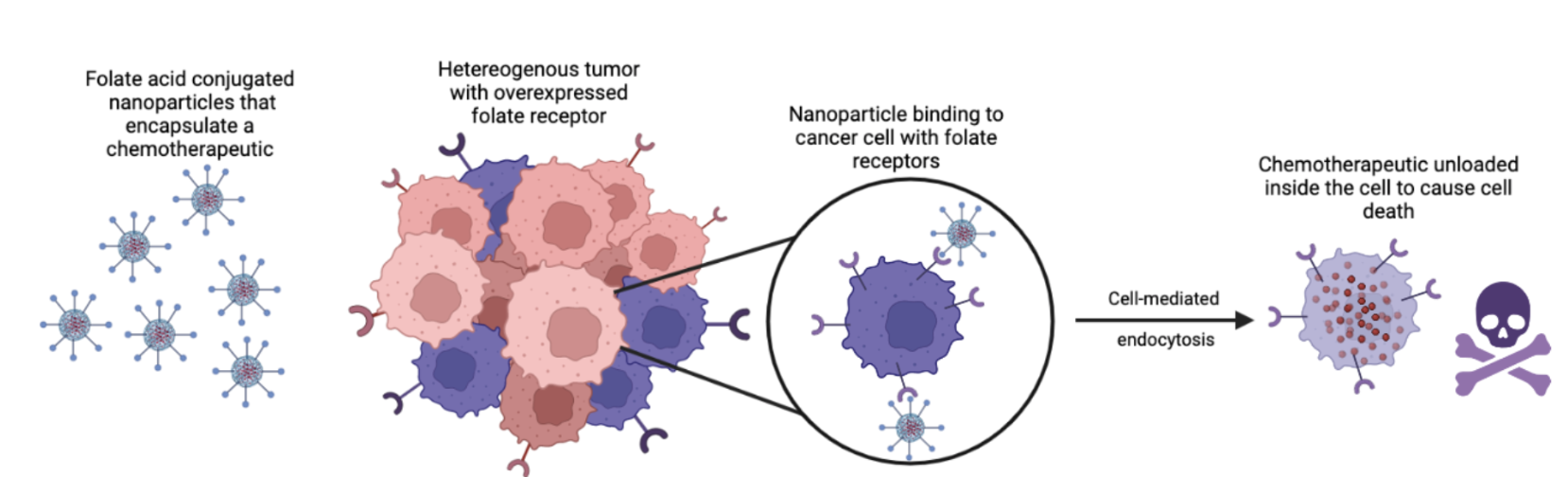
Example of using a therapeutic nanoparticle for targeted drug delivery to cancer cells.

==== Nucleic acid-based molecules ====
Nanogels are advantageous carriers of small, nucleic-acid based molecules that can be employed to treat a variety of diseases. Examples of three different types of molecules that fall into this category, oligonucleotides, miRNA, and nucleoside analogs, are discussed here. In one study, cationic synthetic nanogels modified with insulin and transferrin were synthesized to transport oligonucleotides, a possible therapeutic and diagnostic tool for neurodegenerative disorders, to the brain. These nanogels successfully localized through an in vitro model of the blood-brain barrier and accumulated in the brain in a mouse model. With the treatment of cardiovascular diseases in mind, polysaccharide-based nanogels have been functionalized with fucoidan to target overexpressed P-selectin receptors on platelets and endothelial cells. After loading with miRNA, these nanogels bound to platelets and became internalized by an endothelial cell line. Nanogels have also been used to encapsulate phosphorylated nucleoside analogs, or active forms of anticancer therapeutics. In one study, nanogels loaded with nucleoside 5'-triphosphates underwent surface modifications and successfully bound to overexpressed folate receptors on breast cancer cells. These nanogels were then internalized by the cells and produced a significant increase in cytotoxicity compared to control groups.

==== Stimuli-responsive nanogels for drug delivery ====
Nanogels that respond to various stimuli including changes in pH and temperature or the presence of redox and light cues have proven to be useful tools for drug delivery. One such responsive nanogel was designed to switch from a surface negative charge to a surface positive charge upon exposure to decrease in pH once inside a tumor. When loaded with a chemotherapeutic agent, this technology induced a lower viability in 3D tumor spheroids compared to control groups. Another type of nanogel loaded with osteoarthritis anti-inflammatory drugs was found to significantly increase the amount of drug transported after topical application to the skin and exposure to its natural elevated temperature. One group reported a method to control the release rate of an antiplatelet medication from a nanogel by using UV light to alter the crosslinking density of the polymer and subsequently change the swelling rate. Additionally, other nanogels have been synthesized to include disulfide cleavable polymers that respond to reductive cues in the surrounding environment. One such nanogel was loaded with a chemotherapeutic agent and demonstrated a decrease in cell viability compared to a free version of the same agent.

=== Imaging and diagnostics ===
In addition to drug delivery applications, nanogels have been utilized as a type of imaging modality as they can encapsulate small dyes and other reporter molecules.

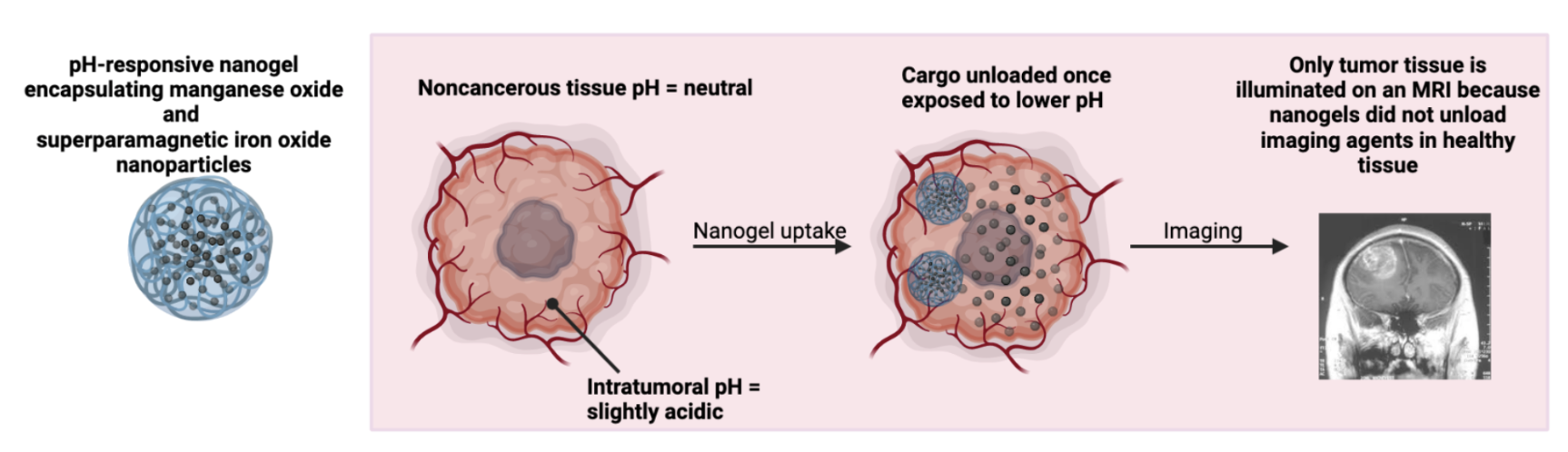
An example of pH-responsive nanogels to increase MRI sensitivity.

==== MRI imaging ====
Typical MRI contrast agents that contain gadolinium and manganese are quickly excreted from the body and carry risks of increased toxicity. Nanogels aim to circumvent these limitations by encapsulating these agents and increasing their relaxivity, or sensitivity. One study encapsulated gadolinium-III within a nanogel and observed a significant enhancement in relaxivity compared to a clinically available formulation of gadolinium-III. Another group developed pH-responsive nanogels containing both manganese oxide and superparamagnetic iron oxide nanoparticles that successfully imaged small tumors, where the pH was more acidic compared to the surrounding healthy tissues. Fluorine-containing nanogels can also be used as tracers for 19F MRI, because their aggregation and tissue binding has only minor effect on their 19F MRI signal. Furthermore, they can carry drugs and their physico-chemical properties of the polymers can be highly modulated.

==== PET imaging ====
Similar to MRI imaging, metal radionuclides can be loaded into nanogels and crosslinked to obtain PET radiotracers for imaging. Nanogels containing copper isotopes commonly used for PET imaging demonstrated overall stability and accumulation in tumors, which produced a higher signal in comparison to nearby tissue. Other studies have explored similar technologies with redox-responsive nanogels loaded with an isotope of gallium and other trivalent metals for PET imaging. Nanogels composed of dextran have also been developed for imaging tumor-associated macrophages with radionuclides and targeting the bone.

==== Other optical imaging ====
For in vivo fluorescence-based optical imaging, dyes that emit near infrared (NIR) wavelengths >700 nm are most effective, such as indocyanine green, but encounter limitations with reduced circulation time and nonspecific interactions with other biological factors that affect the fluorescence. pH-sensitive nanogels with functionalized surface receptors to target cancer cells were loaded with a fluorescent dye that was only released upon endocytosis. These nanogels successfully generated a fluorescent signal from within the cancer cells and many other groups have developed similar technologies.

=== Regenerative medicine ===
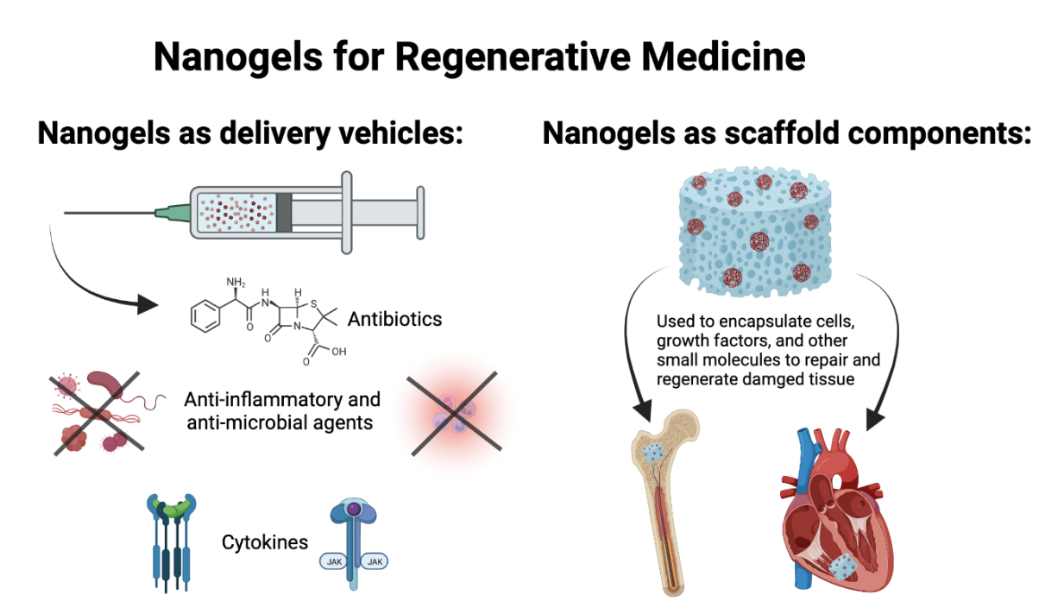
Various applications of nanogels in regenerative medicine contexts including as injectable delivery vehicles and as components of implantable polymeric scaffolds.

==== Wound healing ====
Nanogels are a promising technology being explored to aid in the wound healing process. Given their ability to encapsulate various types of cargo, nanogels can strategically deliver anti-inflammatory agents, antimicrobial drugs, and necessary growth factors to facilitate new tissue growth and blood vessel formation. Chitosan-based nanogels have demonstrated an improved wound healing effect in previous studies. Chitosan-based nanogels encapsulating interleukin-2 were successfully used to stimulate the immune system and advance the wound healing process. Additionally, chitosan-based nanogels carrying an antibiotic, silver sulfadiazine, were found to decrease the size of second-degree burns in one in vivo study. In another study, silver-loaded nanogels were synthesized in a natural polymer-based solution containing aloe vera, and the presence of aloe vera led to increased healing and a decrease in wound size. With the goal of preventing infection and accelerating the healing process, one group has also published a new nanogel design consisting of an encapsulating core and a functionalized outer surface capable of targeting bacteria present in wounds.

==== Tissue regeneration ====
To repair and regenerate damaged tissue, nanogels have been explored to not only encapsulate drugs and growth factors for local administration, but also to serve as porous scaffolds at a tissue implantation site. Boron-containing temperature-responsive nanogels formed a solid scaffold upon injection into a critical bone defect and continued to induce the production of new osteoblast cells. To treat the effects of myocardial infarction, one in vivo study loaded temperature-responsive nanogels with cardiac stem cells and observed improved cardiac function through an increase in left ventricular ejection. Blood vessels have been successfully regenerated in an in vivo model of ischemia using nanogels to encapsulate vascular endothelial growth factors. Heparin-based nanogels loaded with growth factors have also been tested in the regeneration of the urethral muscle that causes urinary incontinence.

=== Other applications ===
==== Sensors ====
A fluorescent nanogel thermometer was developed to measure temperatures to within 0.5 °C (0.90 °F) in living cells. The cell absorbs water when colder and squeezes the water out as its internal temperature rises; the relative quantity of water masks or exposes the fluorescence of the nanogel.
