= Drug Development and Industrial Pharmacy =

- Discipline: Pharmaceutical Science
- Language: English
- Edited by: Hugh D. C. Smyth

Publication details
- Former name: Drug Development Communications
- History: First published 1974
- Publisher: Informa Pharmaceutical Science
- Frequency: Monthly
- Open access: No
- Impact factor: 2.295 (2016)

Standard abbreviations
- ISO 4: Drug Dev. Ind. Pharm.

Indexing
- ISSN: 0363-9045 (print); 1520-5762 (web)

Links
- Journal homepage

Drug Development and Industrial Pharmacy is an academic journal that publishes research on aspects of drug development and production, as well as the evaluation of drugs and pharmaceutical products.

== Core areas ==
Topics covered include:

- Emerging technologies in pharmaceutical development and industrial pharmacy
- In vitro–In vivo correlations
- Oral controlled release systems
- Drug delivery
- Preclinical drug development, pharmacokinetics and pharmacodynamics
- Drug pharmacokinetics and pharmacodynamics
- Biopharmaceutics and oral absorption
- Aerosols
- Transdermals
- Preformulation and physical pharmacy
- Methodologies, including statistical design/optimisation, if there is clear clinical relevance.

The journal is owned by Informa plc, a United Kingdom–based publisher and conference company.

== Editor ==
Hugh D. Smyth is the journal's editor-in-chief. He holds the Delgado Endowed Professorship at the College of Pharmacy, University of Texas at Austin.

== Publication format ==
The journal publishes 12 issues per year in simultaneous print and online editions and is available on a subscription basis. Individual articles can be purchased on a pay-per-view basis. All back-issues of the journal are available online and are hosted on the publisher's website.

Subscribers to the electronic edition of the journal receive access to the online archive, which dates back to 1974.
