= Dose dumping =

Dose dumping is a phenomenon of drug metabolism in which environmental factors can cause the premature and exaggerated release of a drug. This can greatly increase the concentration of a drug in the body and thereby produce adverse effects or even drug-induced toxicity.

Dose dumping is most commonly seen in drugs taken by mouth and digested in the gastrointestinal tract. Around the same time patients take their medication, they can also ingest other substances like fatty meals or alcohol that increase drug delivery. The substances may act on the drug's capsule to speed up drug release, or they may stimulate the body's absorptive surfaces to increase the rate of drug uptake.

Dose dumping is a disadvantage found in extended release dosage form.

In general, drug companies try to avoid drugs with significant dose dumping effects. Such drugs are prone to problems and are often pulled from the market. Such was the case with the pain medication Palladone Once Daily formulation due to its dose-dumping effects when taken with alcohol.

== Types of dose dumping ==
=== Alcohol-induced dose dumping (AIDD) ===
It is by definition an unintended rapid release in large amounts of a modified-release dosage due to a co-ingestion with ethanol.

Some interactions between alcohol, biological factors and the presentation of the drug can influence the apparition of AIDD by:

- Disrupting the drug release mechanism.
- Prolonging gastric emptying.
- Changing the amount of gastric acid.
- Enhancing the drug absorption due to an increase in solubility.
- Increasing the wetting effect and therefore speeding up the drug release.
- A decrease in swelling capacity by the matrix, accelerating the release.

=== Food-induced dose dumping (FIDD) ===
Food intake produces dynamic changes in digestion and pharmacokinetics through a variety of mechanisms, which can produce an unintended release of modified-release dosages under certain circumstances. Usually, high fat diets are the most associated with this phenomenon, but there is evidence that standard-composition food can cause this even in immediate release formulations, such as the case of methylphenidate.

Some of the mechanisms involved in FIDD are:

- Changes in composition and volumes of luminal fluid.
- Modification in gastrointestinal motility and consequently transit time of the stomach.
- Variation in concentration of bile salts and lipids.
- Loss of drug's matrix integrity due to changes in pH, fat and bile.
