= Mucoadhesion =

Mucoadhesion describes the attractive forces between a biological material and mucus or mucous membrane. Mucous membranes adhere to epithelial surfaces such as the gastrointestinal tract (GI-tract), the vagina, the lung, the eye, etc. They are generally hydrophilic as they contain many hydrogen macromolecules due to the large amount of water (approximately 95%) within its composition. However, mucin also contains glycoproteins that enable the formation of a gel-like substance. Understanding the hydrophilic bonding and adhesion mechanisms of mucus to biological material is of utmost importance in order to produce the most efficient applications. For example, in drug delivery systems, the mucus layer must be penetrated in order to effectively transport micro- or nanosized drug particles into the body. Bioadhesion is the mechanism by which two biological materials are held together by interfacial forces. The mucoadhesive properties of polymers can be evaluated via rheological synergism studies with freshly isolated mucus, tensile studies and mucosal residence time studies. Results obtained with these in vitro methods show a high correlation with results obtained in humans.

== Mucoadhesive bondings ==
Mucoadhesion involves several types of bonding mechanisms, and it is the interaction between each process that allows for the adhesive process. The major categories are wetting theory, adsorption theory, diffusion theory, electrostatic theory, and fracture theory. Specific processes include mechanical interlocking, electrostatic, diffusion interpenetration, adsorption and fracture processes.

== Bonding mechanisms ==
Wetting theory: Wetting is the oldest and most prevalent theory of adhesion. The adhesive components in a liquid solution anchor themselves in irregularities on the substrate and eventually harden, providing sites on which to adhere. Surface tension effects restrict the movement of the adhesive along the surface of the substrate, and is related to the thermodynamic work of adhesion by Dupre's Equation. Measuring the affinity of the adhesive for the substrate is performed by determining the contact angle. Contact angles closer to zero indicate a more wettable interaction, and those interactions have a greater spreadability.

Adsorption theory: Adsorption is another widely accepted theory, where adhesion between the substrate and adhesive is due to primary and secondary bonding. The primary bonds are due to chemisorption, and result in comparatively long lasting covalent and non-covalent bonds. Among covalent bonds disulfide bonds are likely most important. Thiolated polymers – designated thiomers – are mucoadhesive polymers that can form disulfide bonds with cysteine-rich subdomains of mucus glycoproteins. Recently several new classes of polymers have been developed that are capable of forming covalent bonds with mucosal surfaces similarly to thiomers. These polymers have acryloyl, methacryloyl, maleimide, boronate and N‐hydroxy (sulfo) succinimide ester groups in their structure. Among non-covalent bonds likely ionic interactions such as interactions of mucoadhesive chitosans with the anionically charged mucus and Hydrogen bonding are most important. The secondary bonds include weak Van Der Waals forces, and interactions between hydrophobic substructure.

Diffusion theory: The mechanism for diffusion involves polymer and mucin chains from the adhesive penetrating the matrix of the substrate and forming a semipermanent bond. As the similarities between the adhesive and the substrate increase, so does the degree of mucoadhesion. The bond strength increases with the degree of penetration, increasing the adhesion strength. The penetration rate is determined by the diffusion coefficient, the degree of flexibility of the adsorbate chains, mobility and contact time. The diffusion mechanism itself is affected by the length of the molecular chains being implanted and cross-linking density, and is driven by a concentration gradient.

Electrostatic theory: is an electrostatic process involving the transfer of electrons across the interface between the substrate and adhesive. The net result is the formation of a double layer of charges that are attracted to each other due to balancing of the Fermi layers, and therefore cause adhesion. This theory only works given the assumption that the substrate and adhesive have different electrostatic surface characteristics.

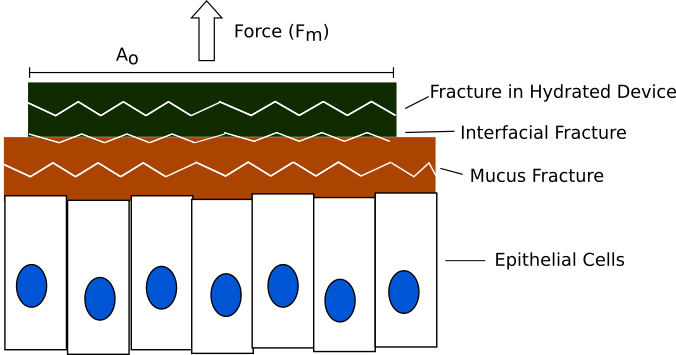
Places where fractures can occur when testing fracture theory. Fracture theory looks for force required to separate at the interface, but fractures can occur due to cohesive failure within either of the layers.

Fracture theory: Fracture theory is the major mechanism by which to determine the mechanical strength of a particular mucoadhesive, and describes the force necessary to separate the two materials after mucoadhesion has occurred. Ultimate tensile strength is determined by the separating force and the total surface area of the adhesion, and failure generally occurs in one of the surfaces rather than at the interface. Since the fracture theory only deals with the separation force, the diffusion and penetration of polymers is not accounted for in this mechanism.

== Stages of mucoadhesive process ==
The mucoadhesive process will differ greatly depending on the surface and properties of the adhesive. However, two general steps of the process have been identified: the contact stage and the consolidation stage.

=== Contact stage ===
The contact stage is the initial wetting that occurs between the adhesive and membrane. This can occur mechanically by bringing together the two surfaces, or through the bodily systems, like when particles are deposited in the nasal cavity by inhalation. The principles of initial adsorption of small molecule adsorbates can be described by DLVO theory.

==== Adsorption theory ====
According to DLVO theory, particles are held in suspension by a balance of attractive and repulsive forces. This theory can be applied to the adsorption of small molecules like mucoadhesive polymers, on surfaces, like mucus layers. Particles in general experience attractive van der Waals forces that promote coagulation; in the context of adsorption, the particle and mucus layers are naturally attracted. The attractive forces between particles increases with decreasing particle size due to increasing surface-area-to-volume ratio. This increases the strength of van der Waals interactions, so smaller particles should be easier to adsorb onto mucous membranes.

DLVO theory also explains some of the challenges in establishing contact between particles and mucus layers in mucoadhesion due to their repulsive forces. Surfaces will develop an electrical double layer if they are in a solution containing ions, as is the case with many bodily systems, creating electrostatic repulsive forces between the adhesive and surface. Steric effects can also hinder particle adsorption to surfaces. Entropy or disorder of a system will decrease as polymeric mucoadhesives adsorb to surfaces, which makes establishing contact between the adhesive and membrane more difficult. Adhesives with large surface groups will also experience a decrease in entropy as they approach the surface, creating repulsion.

==== Wettability theory ====
The initial adsorption of the molecule adhesive will also depend on the wetting between the adhesive and membrane. This can be described using Young's equation:

${{{ \cos(\theta) \; = \; \frac{\gamma_{mg} \; - \gamma_{bm} \;}{\gamma_{bg}}}}}$

where $\gamma_{mg}$ is the interfacial tension between the membrane and gas or bodily environment, $\gamma_{bm}$ is the interfacial tension between the bioadhesive and membrane, $\gamma_{bg}$ is the interfacial tension between the bioadhesive and bodily environment, and $\theta$ is the contact angle of the bioadhesive on the membrane. The ideal contact angle is 0° meaning the bioadhesive perfectly wets the membrane and good contact is achieved. The interfacial tensions can be measured using common experimental techniques such as a Wilhelmy plate or the Du Noüy ring method to predict if the adhesive will make good contact with the membrane.

=== Consolidation stage ===
==== Strong and prolonged adhesion ====
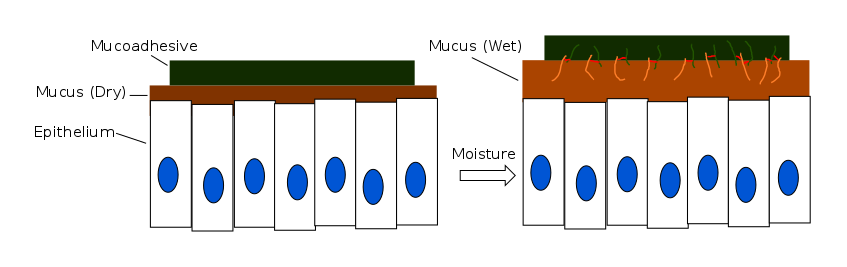
Mode of action of mucoadhesion. Dry mucus will not adhere to a mucoadhesive, but in the presence of moisture the mucus becomes plastic and can form intermolecular bonds.

The consolidation stage of mucoadhesion involves the establishment of adhesive interactions to reinforce strong or prolonged adhesion. When moisture is present, mucoadhesive materials become activated and the system becomes plasticized. This stimulus allows the mucoadhesive molecules to separate and break free while proceeding to link up by weak van der Waals and hydrogen bonds. Consolidation factors are essential for the surface when exposed to significant dislodging stresses. Multiple mucoadhesion theories exist that explain the consolidation stage, the main two which focus on macromolecular interpenetration and dehydration.

==== Macromolecular interpenetration theory ====
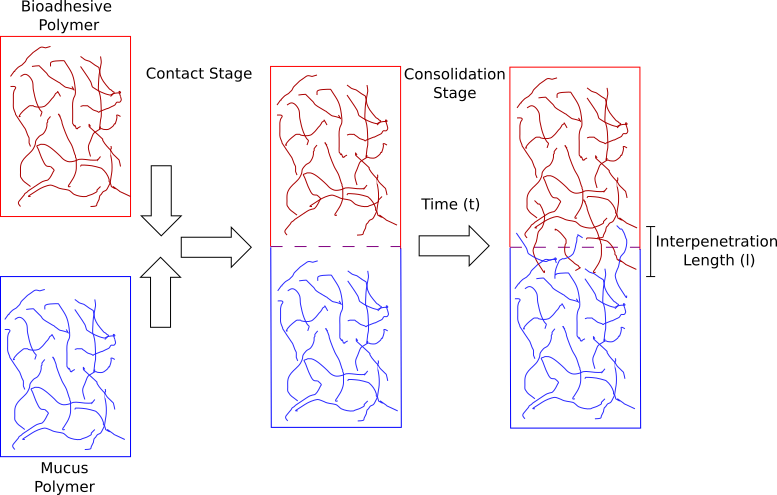
Interpenetration of a bioadhesive with mucus. In the contact stage, the two materials are brought into contact. In the consolidation stage the interpenetration of the polymers occurs.

The Macromolecular Interpenetration theory, also known as the diffusion theory, states that the mucoadhesive molecules and mucus glycoproteins mutually interact by means of interpenetration of their chains and the forming of secondary semi-permanent adhesive bonds. It is necessary that the mucoadhesive device has features or properties that favor both chemical and mechanical interactions for the macromolecular interpenetration theory to take place. Molecules that can present mucoadhesive properties are molecules with hydrogen bond building groups, high molecular weight, flexible chains, and surface active properties.

It is perceived that increase in adhesion force is associated with the degree of penetration of polymer chains. Literature states that the degree of penetration required for efficient bioadhesive bonds lies in the range of 0.2-0.5μm. The following equation can be used to estimate the degree of penetration of polymer and mucus chains:

${{l = {(t \times D_b})^{1/2}}}$

with $t$ as contact time and $D_b$ as the diffusion coefficient of the mucoadhesive material in the mucus. Maximum adhesion strength is reached when penetration depth is approximately equal to polymer chain size. Properties of mutual solubility and structural similarity will improve the mucoadhesive bond.

==== Dehydration theory ====
The dehydration theory explains why mucoadhesion can arise rapidly. When two gels capable of rapid gelation in an aqueous environment are brought into contact, movement occurs between the two gels until a state of equilibrium is reached. Gels associated with a strong affinity for water will have high osmotic pressures and large swelling forces. The difference in osmotic pressure when these gels contact mucus gels will draw water into the formulation and quickly dehydrate the mucus gel, forcing intermixing and consolidation until equilibrium results.

This mixture of formulation and mucus can increase contact time with the mucous membrane, leading to the consolidation of the adhesive bond. However, the dehydration theory does not apply to solid formulations or highly hydrated forms.

== Mucoadhesives in drug delivery ==
Depending on the dosage form and route of administration, mucoadhesives may be used for either local or systemic drug delivery. An overview on the mucoadhesive properties of mucoadhesives is provided by Vjera Grabovac and Andreas Bernkop-Schnürch. The bioavailability of such drugs is affected by many factors unique to each route of application. In general, mucoadhesives work to increase the contact time at these sites, prolonging the residence time and maintaining an effective release rate. These polymeric coatings may be applied to a wide variety of liquid and solid dosages, each specially suited for the route of administration.

=== Dosage Forms ===
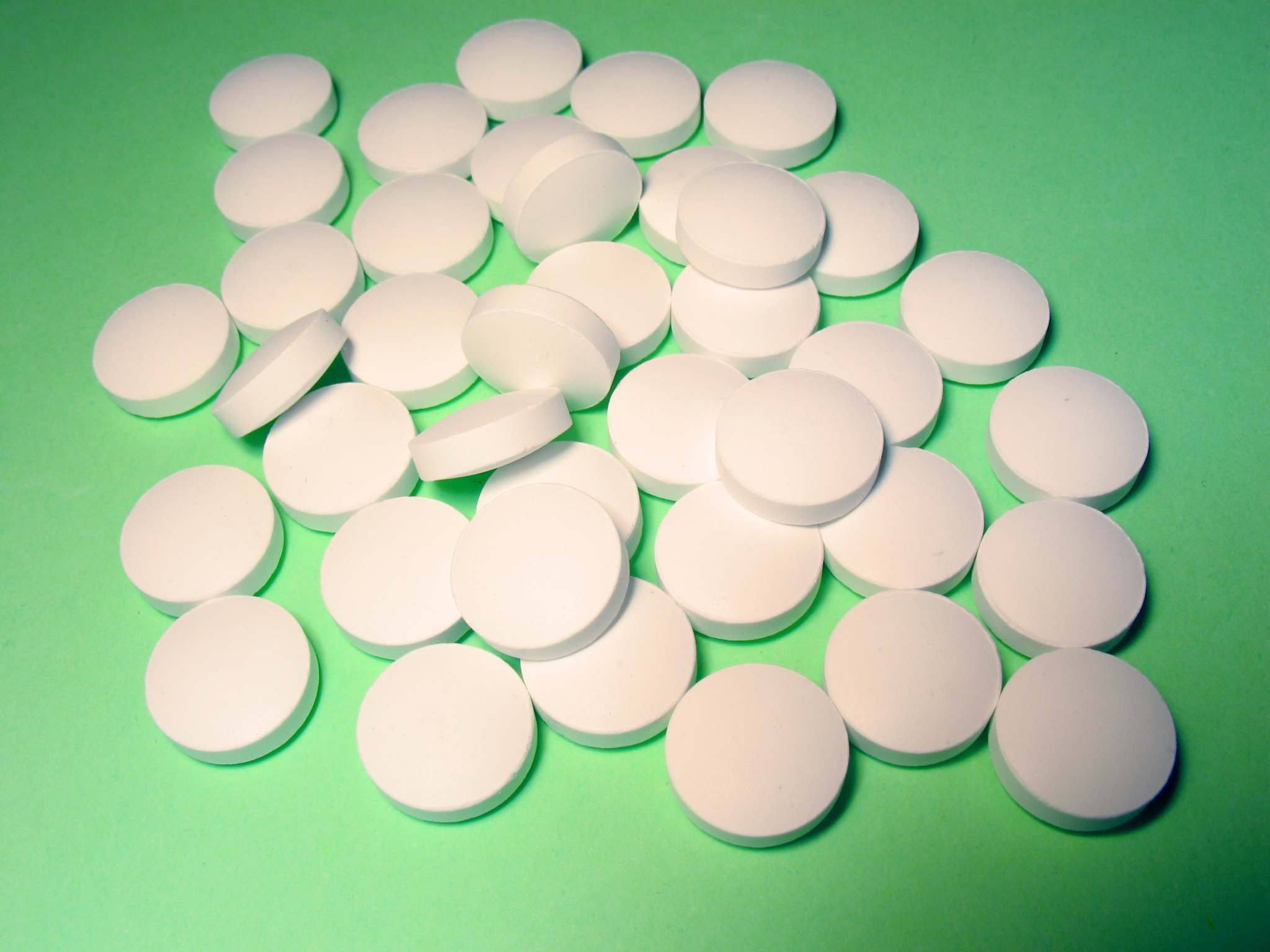
Disk-shaped tablets

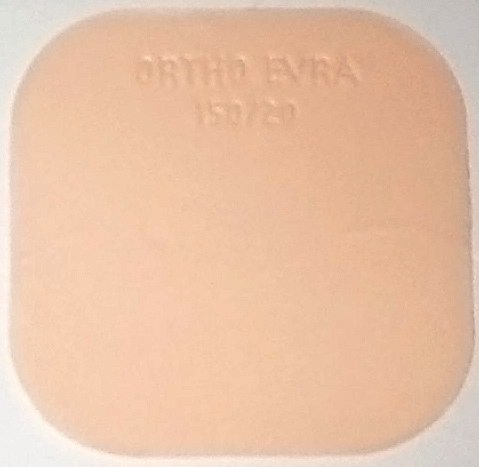
Common Patch System

==== Tablets ====
Tablets are small, solid dosages suitable for the use of mucoadhesive coatings. The coating may be formulated to adhere to a specific mucosa, enabling both systemic and targeted local administration. Tablets are generally taken enterally, as the size and stiffness of the form results in poor patient compliance when administered through other routes.

==== Patches ====
In general, patches consist of three separate layers that contribute and control the release of medicine. The outer impermeable backing layer controls the direction of release and reduces drug loss away from the site of contact. It also protects the other layers and acts as a mechanical support. The middle reservoir layer holds the drug and is tailored to provide the specified dosage. The final inner layer consists of the mucoadhesive, allowing the patch to adhere to the specified mucosa.

==== Creams ====
Creams are semi-solid dosage forms that are particularly effective for mucosal application due to their ease of spreadability and patient comfort. While traditional water-based creams often suffer from rapid leakage and short residence times, modern mucoadhesive formulations incorporate specialized polymers to enhance attachment to the mucosal surface.

A significant advancement in this area is the development of anhydrous (water-free) self-emulsifying bases. These bases remain stable during storage but transform into a mucoadhesive emulsion upon contact with physiological fluids. This mechanism significantly reduces leakage and prolongs the drug's contact time with the tissue, making them ideal for vaginal or buccal delivery. Furthermore, anhydrous systems can accommodate a broader range of both hydrophilic and lipophilic active pharmaceutical ingredients (APIs) while offering improved chemical stability compared to traditional aqueous creams.

==== Gels ====
As a liquid or semisolid dosage, gels are typically used where a solid form would affect the patient's comfort. As a trade-off, conventional gels have poor retention rates. This results in unpredictable losses of the drug, as the non-solid dosage is unable to maintain its position at the site of administration. Mucoadhesives increase retention by dynamically increasing the viscosity of the gel after application. This allows the gel to effectively administer the drug at the local site while maintaining the comfort of the patient.

==== Solutions ====
These dosage forms are commonly used to deliver drugs to the eye and nasal cavity. They often include mucoadhesive polymers to improve retention on dynamic mucosal surfaces. Some advanced eye drop formulations may also turn from a liquid to a gel (so called in situ gelling systems) upon drug administration. For example, gel-forming solutions containing Pluronics could be used to improve the efficiency of eye drops and provide better retention on ocular surfaces.

== Routes of Administration ==
=== Oromucosal ===
With a 0.1-0.7 mm thick mucus layer, the oral cavity serves as an important route of administration for mucoadhesive dosages. Permeation sites can be separated into two groups: sublingual and buccal, in which the former is much more permeable than the latter. However, the sublingual mucosa also produces more saliva, resulting in relatively low retention rates. Thus, sublingual mucosa is preferable for rapid onset and short duration treatments, while the buccal mucosa is more appropriate for longer dosage and onset times. Because of this dichotomy, the oral cavity is suitable for both local and systemic administration. Some common dosage forms for the oral cavity include gels, ointments, patches, and tablets. Depending on the dosage form, some drug loss can occur due to swallowing of saliva. This can be minimized by layering the side of the dosage facing the oral cavity with an impermeable coating(,) commonly seen in patches.

=== Nasal ===
With an active surface area of 160 cm^{2}, the nasal cavity is another noteworthy route of mucoadhesive administration. Due to the sweeping motion of the cilia that lines the mucosa, nasal mucus has a quick turnover of 10 to 15 minutes. Because of this, the nasal cavity is most suitable for rapid, local medicinal dosages. Additionally, its close proximity to the blood–brain barrier makes it a convenient route for administering specialized drugs to the central nervous system. Gels, solutions, and aerosols are common dosage forms in the nasal cavity. However, recent research into particles and microspheres have shown increased bioavailability over non-solid forms of medicine largely due to the use of mucoadhesives.

=== Ocular ===
Within the eye, it is difficult to achieve therapeutic concentrations through systemic administration. Often, other parts of the body will reach toxic levels of the medication before the eye reaches the treatment concentration. Consequently, direct administration through the fibrous tunic is common. This is made difficult due to the numerous defense mechanisms in place, such as blinking, tear production, and the tightness of the corneal epithelium. Estimates put tear turnover rates at 5 minutes, meaning most conventional drugs are not retained for long periods of time. Mucoadhesives increase retention rates, either by enhancing the viscosity or bonding directly to one of the mucosae surrounding the eye.

=== Intravesical ===
Intravesical drug administration is the delivery of pharmaceuticals to the urinary bladder through a catheter. This route of administration is used for the therapy of bladder cancer and interstitial cystitis. The retention of dosage forms in the bladder is relatively poor, which is related to the need for a periodical urine voiding. Some mucoadhesive materials are able to stick to mucosal lining in the bladder, resist urine wash out effects and provide a sustained drug delivery.

== See also ==
- Bioadhesives
- Thiomer
- Wetting
- Adsorption
- DLVO theory
