= Stefan adhesion =

Type of intermolecular force

Stefan adhesion is the normal stress (force per unit area) acting between two discs when their separation is attempted. Stefan's law governs the flow of a viscous fluid between the solid parallel plates and thus the forces acting when the plates are approximated or separated. The force $F$ resulting at distance $h$ between two parallel circular disks of radius $R$, immersed in a Newtonian fluid with viscosity $\eta$, at time $t$, depends on the rate of change of separation $\frac{d h}{d t}$ :

$$F=\frac{3\pi \eta\ R^4}{2h^3} \frac{d h}{d t}$$

Stefan adhesion is mentioned in conjunction with bioadhesion by mucus-secreting animals. Nevertheless, most such systems violate the assumptions of the equation. In addition, these systems are much more complex when the fluid is non-Newtonian or inertial effects are relevant (high flow rate).

== Applications ==
Stefan adhesion is relevant in a range of biological and engineering systems. In biological contexts, it is used to model adhesion mechanisms in mucus-secreting organisms such as gastropods and amphibians, where viscous forces resist the separation of contacting surfaces. In microelectromechanical systems (MEMS) and microfluidic devices, Stefan adhesion is considered in the design of components involving small fluid gaps, such as microvalves and actuators, where viscous resistance can influence device performance.

== Limitations ==
The classical Stefan adhesion equation assumes a Newtonian fluid, incompressibility, no-slip boundary conditions, and negligible inertial effects. These assumptions may not hold in systems involving non-Newtonian fluids, deformable boundaries, or high separation velocities. Biological fluids such as mucus often exhibit viscoelastic or shear-thinning behavior, necessitating modifications to the standard model. Additionally, surface roughness, partial wetting, and compliance of the contacting bodies can alter the measured adhesion force.

== Mathematical extensions ==
Several extensions to the original Stefan model have been proposed to address deviations from its simplifying assumptions. These include formulations for viscoelastic fluids, deformable substrates, and non-circular geometries. In systems with non-Newtonian fluids, constitutive models such as the Maxwell or Oldroyd-B equations are used to describe time-dependent viscosity. Numerical methods, including finite element simulations, are employed to solve more complex geometries and fluid behaviors.

== Experimental methods ==
Experimental measurements of Stefan adhesion typically involve separating two parallel plates with a controlled fluid layer between them while monitoring the resulting force. Micro- and nanoscale techniques, such as atomic force microscopy (AFM), are also used to characterize Stefan adhesion forces in soft matter systems and bioadhesive materials, where force resolution on the order of nanonewtons may be required.
