= Self-microemulsifying drug delivery system =

A self-microemulsifying drug delivery system (SMEDDS) is a drug delivery system that uses a microemulsion achieved by chemical rather than mechanical means. That is, by an intrinsic property of the drug formulation, rather than by special mixing and handling. It employs the familiar ouzo effect displayed by anethole in many anise-flavored liquors. Microemulsions have significant potential for use in drug delivery, and SMEDDS (including so-called "U-type" microemulsions) are the best of these systems identified to date. SMEDDS are of particular value in increasing the absorption of lipophilic drugs taken by mouth.

SMEDDS in research or development include formulations of the drugs anethole trithione, oridonin, curcumin, vinpocetine, tacrolimus, mitotane, berberine hydrochloride, nobiletin, piroxicam, anti-malaria drugs beta-artemether and halofantrine, anti-HIV drug UC 781, nimodipine, exemestane, anti-cancer drugs 9-nitrocamptothecin (9-NC) paclitaxel, and seocalcitol, alprostadil (intraurethral use), probucol, itraconazole, fenofibrate, acyclovir, simvastatin, xibornol, silymarin, alpha-asarone, enilconazole, puerarin (an isoflavone found in Pueraria lobata), atorvastatin, heparin, carvedilol, ketoconazole, gentamicin, labrasol, flurbiprofen, celecoxib, danazol, cyclosporine, and idebenone.

Actual applications of Self-microemulsifying drug delivery system' (SMEDDS) remain rare. The first drug marketed as a SMEDDS was cyclosporin, and it had significantly improved bioavailability compared with the conventional solution. In the last decade, several SMEDDS loaded with antiviral drugs (ritonavir, saquinavir) were tested for treatment of HIV infection, but the relative improvement in clinical benefit was not significant. The SMEDDS formulation of ritonavir (soft capsules) has been withdrawn in some countries.

Within the last years SMEDDS were also utilized for the oral administration of biologics. Due to ion pairing with appropriate surfactants these mainly hydrophilic macromolecular drugs can be incorporated in the lipophilic phase of SMEDDS. Provided that the oily droplets being formed in the gut are sufficiently stable towards lipases, can permeate the mucus gel layer in sufficient quantities and exhibit permeation enhancing properties the oral bioavailability of various biologics can be strongly improved

SMEDDS offer numerous advantages: spontaneous formation, ease of manufacture, thermodynamic stability, and improved solubilization of bioactive materials. Improved solubility contributes to faster release rates and greater bioavailability. For many drugs taken by mouth, faster release rates improve the drug acceptance by consumers. Greater bioavailability means that less drug need be used; this may lower cost, and does lower the stomach irritation and toxicity of drugs taken by mouth.

For oral use, SMEDDS may be formulated as liquids or solids, the solids packaged in capsules or tablets. Limited studies comparing these report that in terms of bioavailability liquid SMEDDS are superior to solid SMEDDS, which are superior to conventional tablets. Liquid SMEDDS have also shown value in injectable (IV and urethral) formulations and in a topical (oral) spray.

== See also ==
- Excipient
