= Scientia Pharmaceutica =

- Discipline: Pharmaceutical sciences
- Language: English, German
- Edited by: Helmut Viernstein

Publication details
- History: 1930–present
- Publisher: MDPI
- Frequency: Quarterly
- Open access: Yes
- License: cc-by

Standard abbreviations
- ISO 4: Sci. Pharm.

Indexing
- CODEN: SCPHA4
- ISSN: 0036-8709 (print); 2218-0532 (web)

Links
- Journal homepage

Scientia Pharmaceutica is a peer-reviewed open access scientific journal publishing original research papers, short communications and a limited number of reviews on all fields of pharmaceutical sciences and related areas, as well as on pharmaceutical practice. Since 2008 all articles are published open access.

== Abstracting and Indexing ==
The journal is indexed in Web of Science Emerging Sources Citation Index, Scopus, EMBASE, and other indexing services.
