= Bioadhesive =

Natural polymeric materials that act as adhesives

Bioadhesives are natural polymeric materials that act as adhesives. The term is sometimes used more loosely to describe a glue formed synthetically from biological monomers such as sugars, or to mean a synthetic material designed to adhere to biological tissue.

Bioadhesives may consist of a variety of substances, but proteins and carbohydrates feature prominently. Proteins such as gelatin and carbohydrates such as starch have been used as general-purpose glues by man for many years, but typically their performance shortcomings have seen them replaced by synthetic alternatives. Highly effective adhesives found in the natural world are currently under investigation. For example, bioadhesives secreted by microbes and by marine molluscs and crustaceans are being researched with a view to biomimicry. Furthermore, thiolation of proteins and carbohydrates enables these polymers (thiomers) to covalently adhere especially to cysteine-rich subdomains of proteins such as keratins or mucus glycoproteins via disulfide bond formation. Thiolated chitosan and thiolated hyaluronic acid are used as bioadhesives in various medicinal products.

== Bioadhesives in nature ==
Organisms may secrete bioadhesives for use in attachment, construction and obstruction, as well as in predation and defense. Examples include their use for:

- Colonization of surfaces (e.g. bacteria, algae, fungi, mussels, barnacles, rotifers)
- Mussel's byssal threads
- Tube building by polychaete worms, which live in underwater mounds
- Insect egg, larval or pupal attachment to surfaces (vegetation, rocks), and insect mating plugs
- Host attachment by blood-feeding ticks
- Nest-building by some insects, and also by some fish (e.g. the three-spined stickleback)
- Defense by Notaden frogs and by sea cucumbers
- Prey capture in spider webs and by velvet worms

Some bioadhesives are very strong. For example, adult barnacles achieve pull-off forces as high as 2 MPa (2 N/mm^{2}). A similarly strong, rapidly adhering glue - which contains 171 different proteins and can adhere to wet, moist and impure surfaces - is produced by the very hard limpet species Patella vulgata; this adhesive material is a very interesting subject of research in the development of surgical adhesives and several other applications. Silk dope can also be used as a glue by arachnids and insects.

=== Polyphenolic proteins ===
Organisms like mussels and barnacles secrete marine adhesive proteins which insolubilize and gives them the ability to attach to various substrates in a watery environment. One of the main characteristics of marine bioadhesive is their ability to polymerize very quickly in water (within a few minutes), and with a large scale of strengths.

The small family of proteins that are sometimes referred to as polyphenolic proteins are produced by some marine invertebrates like the blue mussel, Mytilus edulis by some algae', and by the polychaete Phragmatopoma californica. These proteins contain a high level of a post-translationally modified—oxidized—form of tyrosine, L-3,4-dihydroxyphenylalanine (levodopa, L-DOPA) as well as the disulfide (oxidized) form of cysteine (cystine). In the zebra mussel (Dreissena polymorpha), two such proteins, Dpfp-1 and Dpfp-2, localize in the juncture between byssus threads and adhesive plaque. The presence of these proteins appear, generally, to contribute to stiffening of the materials functioning as bioadhesives. The presence of the dihydroxyphenylalanine-moiety arises from action of a tyrosine hydroxylase-type of enzyme; in vitro, it has been shown that the proteins can be cross-linked (polymerized) using a mushroom tyrosinase. These properties of Dopa-containing proteins has led to research in Dopa-incorporated proteins, carbohydrates, synthetic polymers with the aim of replicating the ability of organisms to attach to wet surfaces in nature.

The presence of multiple consecutive epidermal growth factor (EGF)/EGF-like domains has been identified to be a common feature of marine adhesives; such domains were first observed in mussel-derived proteins 40 years ago and subsequently observed in the biological adhesives of many marine fouling organisms, including limpets, sea urchins and seastars and sea anemones.

Biofouling, can be defined as the adhesion and subsequent growth of organisms on a substrate in an aquatic environment. It can be observed at any substrate, whether organic or inorganic, biotic abiotic, soft or hard. Settlement on a substrate is a strategy used by aquatic organisms to ensure survival, feeding, a high rate of reproduction, etc.

== Temporary adhesion ==
Organisms such as limpets and sea stars use suction and mucus-like slimes to create Stefan adhesion, which makes pull-off much harder than lateral drag; this allows both attachment and mobility. Spores, embryos and juvenile forms may use temporary adhesives (often glycoproteins) to secure their initial attachment to surfaces favorable for colonization. Tacky and elastic secretions that act as pressure-sensitive adhesives, forming immediate attachments on contact, are preferable in the context of self-defense and predation. Molecular mechanisms include non-covalent interactions and polymer chain entanglement. Many biopolymers – proteins, carbohydrates, glycoproteins, and mucopolysaccharides – may be used to form hydrogels that contribute to temporary adhesion.

== Permanent adhesion ==
Many permanent bioadhesives (e.g., the oothecal foam of the mantis) are generated by a "mix to activate" process that involves hardening via covalent cross-linking. On non-polar surfaces the adhesive mechanisms may include van der Waals forces, whereas on polar surfaces mechanisms such as hydrogen bonding and binding to (or forming bridges via) metal cations may allow higher sticking forces to be achieved.

- Microorganisms use acidic polysaccharides (molecular mass around 100 000 Da)
- Marine bacteria use carbohydrate exopolymers to achieve bond strengths to glass of up to 500 000 N/m^{2}
- Marine invertebrates commonly employ protein-based glues for irreversible attachment. Some mussels achieve 800 000 N/m^{2} on polar surfaces and 30 000 N/m^{2} on non-polar surfaces these numbers are dependent on the environment, mussels in high predation environments have an increased attachment to substrates. In high predation environments it can require predators 140% more force to dislodge mussels
- Some algae and marine invertebrates use lecproteins that contain L-DOPA to effect adhesion
- Proteins in the oothecal foam of the mantis are cross-linked covalently by small molecules related to L-DOPA via a tanning reaction that is catalysed by catechol oxidase or polyphenol oxidase enzymes.

L-DOPA is a tyrosine residue that bears an additional hydroxyl group. The twin hydroxyl groups in each side-chain compete well with water for binding to surfaces, form polar attachments via hydrogen bonds, and chelate the metals in mineral surfaces. The Fe(L-DOPA_{3}) complex can itself account for much cross-linking and cohesion in mussel plaque, but in addition the iron catalyses oxidation of the L-DOPA to reactive quinone free radicals, which go on to form covalent bonds.

== Applications ==
Bioadhesives are of commercial interest because they tend to be biocompatible, i.e. useful for biomedical applications involving skin or other body tissue. Some work in wet environments and under water, while others can stick to low surface energy – non-polar surfaces like plastic. In recent years, the synthetic adhesives industry has been impacted by environmental concerns and health and safety issues relating to hazardous ingredients, volatile organic compound emissions, and difficulties in recycling or re mediating adhesives derived from petrochemical feedstocks. Rising oil prices may also stimulate commercial interest in biological alternatives to synthetic adhesives.

Shellac is an early example of a bioadhesive put to practical use. Additional examples now exist, with others in development:

- Commodity wood adhesive based on a bacterial exopolysaccharide
- USB PRF/Soy 2000, a commodity wood adhesive that is 50% soy hydrolysate and excels at finger-jointing green lumber
- Mussel adhesive proteins can assist in attaching cells to plastic surfaces in laboratory cell and tissue culture experiments (see External Links)
- The Notaden frog glue is under development for biomedical uses, e.g. as a surgical glue for orthopedic applications or as a hemostat
- Mucosal drug delivery applications. For example, films of mussel adhesive protein give comparable mucoadhesion to polycarbophil, a synthetic hydrogel used to achieve effective drug delivery at low drug doses. An increased residence time through adhesion to the mucosal surface, such as in the eye or the nose can lead to an improved absorption of the drug.
- Long-duration continuous imaging of diverse organs (via a wearable bioadhesive stretchable high-resolution ultrasound imaging patch, potentially enabling novel diagnostic and monitoring tools)

Several commercial methods of production are being researched:

- Direct chemical synthesis, e.g. incorporation of L-DOPA groups in synthetic polymers
- Fermentation of transgenic bacteria or yeasts that express bioadhesive protein genes
- Farming of natural organisms (small and large) that secrete bioadhesive materials

== Mucoadhesion ==
A more specific term than bioadhesion is mucoadhesion. Most mucosal surfaces such as in the gut or nose are covered by a layer of mucus. Adhesion of a matter to this layer is hence called mucoadhesion. Mucoadhesive agents are usually polymers containing hydrogen bonding groups that can be used in wet formulations or in dry powders for drug delivery purposes. The mechanisms behind mucoadhesion have not yet been fully elucidated, but a generally accepted theory is that close contact must first be established between the mucoadhesive agent and the mucus, followed by interpenetration of the mucoadhesive polymer and the mucin and finishing with the formation of entanglements and chemical bonds between the macromolecules. In the case of a dry polymer powder, the initial adhesion is most likely achieved by water movement from the mucosa into the formulation, which has also been shown to lead to dehydration and strengthening of the mucus layer. The subsequent formation of van der Waals, hydrogen and, in the case of a positively charged polymer, electrostatic bonds between the mucins and the hydrated polymer promotes prolonged adhesion.

== See also ==
Mucilage
