= Journal of Controlled Release =

- Discipline: Pharmaceutics
- Language: English
- Edited by: Stefaan De Smedt

Publication details
- History: 1984-present
- Publisher: Elsevier
- Frequency: Biweekly
- Impact factor: 10.8 (2022)

Standard abbreviations
- ISO 4: J. Control. Release

Indexing
- CODEN: JCREEC
- ISSN: 0168-3659 (print); 1873-4995 (web)
- OCLC no.: 11301964

Links
- Journal homepage; Online access

The Journal of Controlled Release is a biweekly peer-reviewed medical journal and the official journal of the Controlled Release Society. The journal covers research on the controlled release and delivery of drugs and other biologically active agents. Announcements and reports of future meetings pertaining to the activities of the Controlled Release Society are also included.

According to the Journal Citation Reports, the journal has a 2022 impact factor of 10.8, ranking it 10th out of 275 in the category Pharmacology & Pharmacy.

== Abstracting and indexing ==
The journal is abstracted and indexed in BIOSIS Previews, CAB Abstracts, Chemical Abstracts, Current Contents/Life Sciences, International Pharmaceutical Abstracts, EMBASE, MEDLINE, Polymer Contents, Science Citation Index, and Scopus.
