= Thiomer =

Type of polymer used in medicine

Thiolated polymers – designated thiomers – are functional polymers used in biotechnology product development with the intention to prolong mucosal drug residence time and to enhance absorption of drugs. The name thiomer was coined by Andreas Bernkop-Schnürch in 2000. Thiomers have thiol bearing side chains. Sulfhydryl ligands of low molecular mass are covalently bound to a polymeric backbone consisting of mainly biodegradable polymers, such as chitosan, hyaluronic acid, cellulose derivatives, pullulan, starch, gelatin, polyacrylates, cyclodextrins, or silicones.

Thiomers exhibit properties potentially useful for non-invasive drug delivery via oral, ocular, nasal, vesical, buccal and vaginal routes. Thiomers show also potential in the field of tissue engineering and regenerative medicine. Various thiomers such as thiolated chitosan and thiolated hyaluronic acid are commercially available as scaffold materials. Thiomers can be directly compressed to tablets or given as solutions. In 2012, a second generation of thiomers – called "preactivated" or "S-protected" thiomers – were introduced.

In contrast to thiomers of the first generation, preactivated thiomers are stable towards oxidation and display comparatively higher mucoadhesive and permeation enhancing properties. Approved thiomer products for human use are for example eyedrops for treatment of dry eye syndrome or adhesive gels for treatment of nickel allergy.

== Properties and applications ==
Thiomers crosslink via inter- and intrachain disulfide bonding, form disulfide bonds with thiol substructures of endogenous proteins such as mucins and keratins and bind metals (Me)

=== Mucoadhesion ===
Thiomers are capable of forming disulfide bonds with cysteine substructures of the mucus gel layer covering mucosal membranes. Because of this property they exhibit up to 100-fold higher mucoadhesive properties in comparison to the corresponding unthiolated polymers. Because of their mucoadhesive properties, thiolated polymers are an effective tool in the treatment of diseases such as dry eye, dry mouth, and dry vagina syndrome where dry mucosal surfaces are involved.

=== In situ gelation ===
Various polymers such as poloxamers exhibit in situ gelling properties. Because of these properties they can be administered as liquid formulations forming stable gels once having reached their site of application. An unintended rapid elimination or outflow of the formulation from mucosal membranes such as the ocular, nasal or vaginal mucosa can therefore be avoided. Thiolated polymers are capable of providing a comparatively more pronounced increase in viscosity after application, as an extensive crosslinking process by the formation of disulfide bonds between the polymer chains due to oxidation takes place. This effect was first described in 1999 by Bernkop-Schnürch et al. for polymeric excipients. In case of thiolated chitosan, for instance, a more than 10,000-fold increase in viscosity within a few minutes was shown. These high in situ gelling properties can also be used for numerous further reasons such as for parenteral formulations, as coating material or for food additives

=== Controlled drug release ===
Due to a sustained drug release, a prolonged therapeutic level of drugs exhibiting a short elimination half-life can be maintained. Consequently the frequency of dosing can be reduced contributing to an improved compliance. The release of drugs out of polymeric carrier systems can be controlled by a simple diffusion process. So far the efficacy of such delivery systems, however, was limited by a too rapid disintegration and/or erosion of the polymeric network. By using thiolated polymers this essential shortcoming can be overcome. Because of the formation of inter- and intrachain disulfide bonds during the swelling process, the stability of the polymeric drug carrier matrix is strongly improved. Hence, a controlled drug release for numerous hours is guaranteed. There are numerous drug delivery systems making use of this technology.

=== Enzyme inhibition ===
Due to the binding of metal ions being essential for various enzymes to maintain their enzymatic activity, thiomers are potent reversible enzyme inhibitors. Many non-invasively administered drugs such as therapeutic peptides or nucleic acids are degraded on the mucosa by membrane bound enzymes, strongly reducing their bioavailability. In case of oral administration, this 'enzymatic barrier' is even more pronounced as an additional degradation caused by luminally secreted enzymes takes place. Because of their capability to bind zinc ions via thiol groups, thiomers are potent inhibitors of most membrane bound and secreted zinc-dependent enzymes. Due to this enzyme inhibitory effect, thiolated polymers can significantly improve the bioavailability of non-invasively administered drugs

=== Antimicrobial activity ===
In vitro, thiomers were shown to have antimicrobial activity towards Gram-positive bacteria. In particular, N-acyl thiolated chitosans show great potential as highly efficient, biocompatible and cost-effective antimicrobial compounds. Metabolism and mechanistic studies are under way to optimize these thiomers for clinical applications. Because of their antimicrobial activity, thiolated polymers are also used as coatings that avoid bacterial adhesion.

=== Permeation enhancement ===
Thiomers are able to reversibly open tight junctions. The responsible mechanism seems to be based on the inhibition of protein tyrosine phosphatase being involved in the closing process of tight junctions. Due to thiolation the permeation enhancing effect of polymers such as polyacrylic acid or chitosan can be up to 10-fold improved. In comparison to most low molecular weight permeation enhancers, thiolated polymers offer the advantage of not being absorbed from the mucosal membrane. Hence, their permeation enhancing effect can be maintained for a comparatively longer period of time and systemic toxic side effects of the auxiliary agent can be excluded.

=== Efflux pump inhibition ===
Thiomers are able to reversibly inhibit efflux pumps. Because of this property the mucosal uptake of various efflux pump substrates such as anticancer drugs, antimycotic drugs and antiinflammatory drugs can be tremendously improved. The postulated mechanism of efflux pump inhibition is based on an interaction of thiolated polymers with the channel forming transmembrane domain of various efflux pumps such as P-glycoprotein (P-gp) and multidrug resistance proteins (MRPs). P-gp, for instance, exhibits 12 transmembrane regions forming a channel through which substrates are transported outside of the cell. Two of these transmembrane domains – namely 2 and 11 – exhibit on position 137 and 956, respectively, a cysteine subunit. Thiomers seem to enter in the channel of P-gp and likely form subsequently one or two disulfide bonds with one or both cysteine subunits located within the channel. Due to this covalent interaction the allosteric change of the transporter being essential to move drugs outside of the cell might be blocked.

=== Complexation of metal ions ===
Thiomers have the ability to form complexes with different metal ions, especially divalent metal ions, due to their thiol groups. Thiolated chitosans, for instance, were shown to effectively absorb nickel ions.

=== Tissue engineering and regenerative medicine ===
As thiolated polymers exhibit biocompatibility, cellular mimicking properties and efficiently support proliferation and differentiation of various cell types, they are used as scaffolds for tissue engineering. Furthermore thiolated polymers such as thiolated hyaluronic acid and thiolated chitosan were shown to exhibit wound healing properties.
