= Drug carrier =

Inert medium used in drug-delivery systems

A drug carrier or drug vehicle is a substrate used in the process of drug delivery which serves to improve the selectivity, effectiveness, and/or safety of drug administration. Drug carriers are primarily used to control the release of drugs into systemic circulation. This can be accomplished either by slow release of a particular drug over a long period of time (typically diffusion) or by triggered release at the drug's target by some stimulus, such as changes in pH, application of heat, and activation by light. Drug carriers are also used to improve the pharmacokinetic properties, specifically the bioavailability, of many drugs with poor water solubility and/or membrane permeability.

A wide variety of drug carrier systems have been developed and studied, each of which has unique advantages and disadvantages. Some of the more popular types of drug carriers include liposomes, polymeric micelles, microspheres, and nanoparticles. Different methods of attaching the drug to the carrier have been implemented, including adsorption, integration into the bulk structure, encapsulation, and covalent bonding. Different types of drug carrier utilize different methods of attachment, and some carriers can even implement a variety of attachment methods.

== Carrier types ==
=== Liposomes ===
Liposomes are structures which consist of at least one lipid bilayer surrounding an aqueous core. This hydrophobic/hydrophilic composition is particularly useful for drug delivery as these carriers can accommodate a number of drugs of varying lipophilicity. Disadvantages associated with using liposomes as drug carriers involve poor control over drug release. Drugs which have high membrane-permeability can readily 'leak' from the carrier, while optimization of in vivo stability can cause drug release by diffusion to be a slow and inefficient process. Much of the current research involving liposomes is focused on improving the delivery of anticancer drugs such as doxorubicin and paclitaxel.

=== Polymeric micelles ===
Polymeric micelles are drug carriers formed by the aggregation of some amphiphile\amphiphilic molecule with an amphiphilic block copolymer. These carriers form at some high concentration specific to the compounds used, called the critical micelle concentration. The addition of an amphiphilic block copolymer effectively lowers this critical micelle concentration by shifting the monomer exchange equilibrium. These carriers are comparable to liposomes, however the lack of an aqueous core makes polymeric micelles less accommodating to a wide variety of drugs.

=== Microspheres ===
Microspheres are hollow, micron-sized carriers often formed via self-assembly of polymeric compounds which are most often used to encapsulate the active drug for delivery. Drug release is often achieved by diffusion through pores in the microsphere structure or by degradation of the microsphere shell. Some of the research currently being done uses advanced assembly techniques, such as precision particle fabrication (PPF), to create microspheres capable of sustained control over drug release.

=== Nanostructures ===
==== Nanodiamonds ====
Nanodiamonds (NDs) are carbon nanoparticles which can vary from ~4-100 nm in diameter. NDs are typically formed in two ways: from micron-sized diamond particles under high-pressure high-temperature conditions, called high-pressure high-temperature nanodiamonds (HPHT NDs) and by shock-wave compression, called detonation nanodiamonds (DNDs). The surfaces of these NDs can be modified by processes such as oxidation and aminification to alter adsorption properties.

== Resources ==
The following research papers from IUPAC are in pdf format:

- Biodegradable hydrogels for bone regeneration through growth factor release
- Development of acid-sensitive copolymer micelles for drug delivery
