= Nanoparticle =

Particle with size less than 100 nm

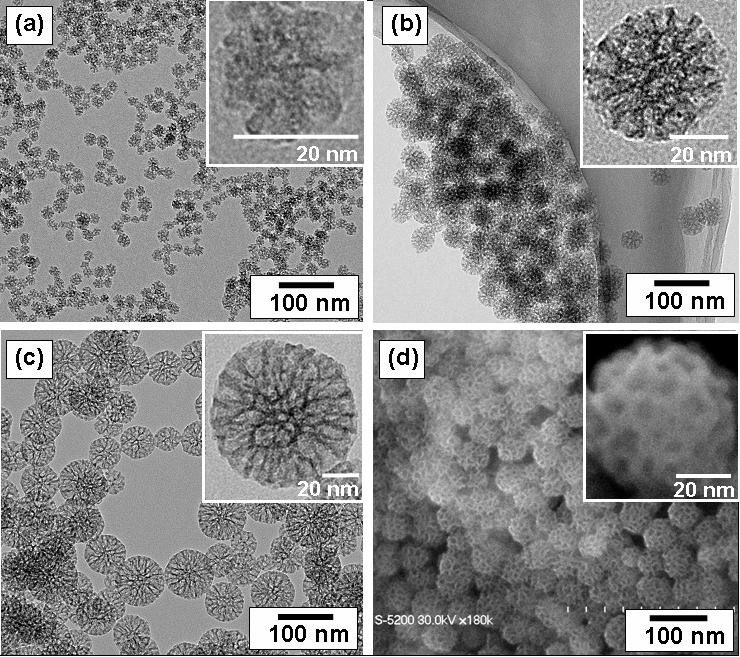
TEM (a, b, and c) images of prepared mesoporous silica nanoparticles with mean outer diameter: (a) 20nm, (b) 45nm, and (c) 80nm. SEM (d) image corresponding to (b). The insets are a high magnification of mesoporous silica particle.

A nanoparticle or ultrafine particle is a particle of matter 1 to 100 nanometres (nm) in diameter. The term is sometimes used for larger particles, up to 500 nm, or fibers and tubes that are less than 100 nm in only two directions. At the lowest range, metal particles smaller than 1 nm are usually called atom clusters instead.

Nanoparticles are distinguished from microparticles (1–1000 μm), "fine particles" (sized between 100 and 2500 nm), and "coarse particles" (ranging from 2500 to 10,000 nm), because their smaller size drives very different physical or chemical properties, like colloidal properties and ultrafast optical effects or electric properties.

Being more subject to the Brownian motion, they usually do not sediment, like colloidal particles that conversely are usually understood to range from 1 to 1000 nm.

Being much smaller than the wavelengths of visible light (400–700 nm), nanoparticles cannot be seen with ordinary optical microscopes, requiring the use of electron microscopes or microscopes with laser. For the same reason, dispersions of nanoparticles in transparent media can be transparent, whereas suspensions of larger particles usually scatter some or all visible light incident on them. Nanoparticles also easily pass through common filters, such as common ceramic candles, so that separation from liquids requires special nanofiltration techniques.

The properties of nanoparticles often differ markedly from those of larger particles of the same substance. Since the typical diameter of an atom is between 0.15 and 0.6 nm, a large fraction of the nanoparticle's material lies within a few atomic diameters of its surface. Therefore, the properties of that surface layer may dominate over those of the bulk material. This effect is particularly strong for nanoparticles dispersed in a medium of different composition since the interactions between the two materials at their interface also becomes significant.

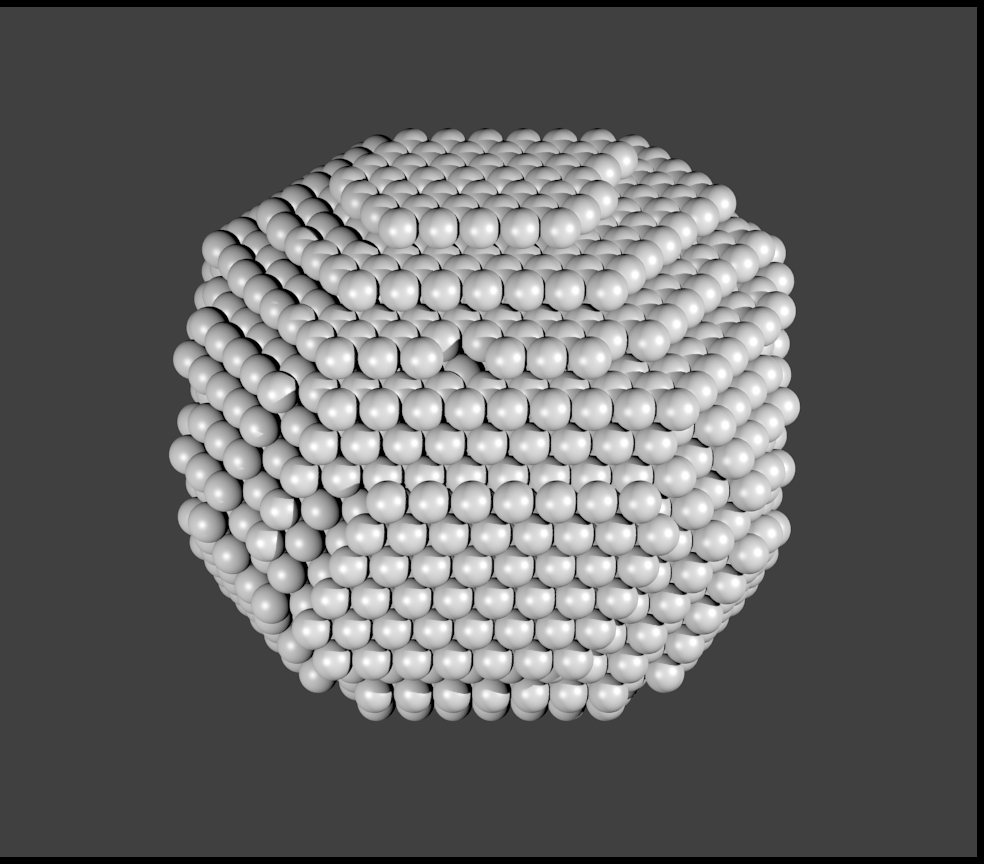
Idealized model of a crystalline nanoparticle of platinum, about 2 nm in diameter, showing individual atoms.

Nanoparticles occur widely in nature and are objects of study in many sciences such as chemistry, physics, geology, and biology. Being at the transition between bulk materials and atomic or molecular structures, they often exhibit phenomena that are not observed at either scale. They are an important component of atmospheric pollution, and key ingredients in many industrialized products such as paints, plastics, metals, ceramics, and magnetic products. The production of nanoparticles with specific properties is a branch of nanotechnology.

In general, the small size of nanoparticles leads to a lower concentration of point defects compared to their bulk counterparts, but they do support a variety of dislocations that can be visualized using high-resolution electron microscopes. However, nanoparticles exhibit different dislocation mechanics, which, together with their unique surface structures, results in mechanical properties that are different from the bulk material.

Non-spherical nanoparticles (e.g., prisms, cubes, rods etc.) exhibit shape-dependent and size-dependent (both chemical and physical) properties (anisotropy). Non-spherical nanoparticles of gold (Au), silver (Ag), and platinum (Pt) due to their fascinating optical properties are finding diverse applications. Non-spherical geometries of nanoprisms give rise to high effective cross-sections and deeper colors of the colloidal solutions. The possibility of shifting the resonance wavelengths by tuning the particle geometry allows using them in the fields of molecular labeling, biomolecular assays, trace metal detection, or nanotechnical applications. Anisotropic nanoparticles display a specific absorption behavior and stochastic particle orientation under unpolarized light, showing a distinct resonance mode for each excitable axis.

== Definitions ==
=== International Union of Pure and Applied Chemistry (IUPAC) ===
In its 2012 proposed terminology for biologically related polymers, the IUPAC defined a nanoparticle as "a particle of any shape with dimensions in the 1 × 10^{−9} and 1 × 10^{−7} m range". This definition evolved from one given by IUPAC in 1997.

In the same 2012 publication, the IUPAC extends the term to include tubes and fibers with only two dimensions below 100 nm.

=== International Organization for Standardization (ISO) ===
According to the International Organization for Standardization (ISO) technical specification 80004, a nanoparticle is an object with all three external dimensions in the nanoscale, whose longest and shortest axes do not differ significantly, with a significant difference typically being a factor of at least 3.

=== Common usage ===
"Nanoscale" is usually understood to be the range from 1 to 100 nm because the novel properties that differentiate particles from the bulk material typically develop at that range of sizes.

For some properties, like transparency or turbidity, ultrafiltration, stable dispersion, etc., substantial changes characteristic of nanoparticles are observed for particles as large as 500 nm. Therefore, the term is sometimes extended to that size range.

=== Related concepts ===
Nanoclusters are agglomerates of nanoparticles with at least one dimension between 1 and 10 nanometers and a narrow size distribution. Nanopowders are agglomerates of ultrafine particles, nanoparticles, or nanoclusters. Nanometer-sized single crystals, or single-domain ultrafine particles, are often referred to as nanocrystals.

The terms colloid and nanoparticle are not interchangeable. A colloid is a mixture which has particles of one phase dispersed or suspended within an other phase. The term applies only if the particles are larger than atomic dimensions but small enough to exhibit Brownian motion, with the critical size range (or particle diameter) typically ranging from nanometers (10^{−9} m) to micrometers (10^{−6} m). Colloids can contain particles too large to be nanoparticles, and nanoparticles can exist in non-colloidal form, for examples as a powder or in a solid matrix.

== History ==
=== Natural occurrence ===
Nanoparticles are naturally produced by many cosmological, geological, meteorological, and biological processes. A significant fraction (by number, if not by mass) of interplanetary dust, that is still falling on the Earth at the rate of thousands of tons per year, is in the nanoparticle range; and the same is true of atmospheric dust particles. Many viruses have diameters in the nanoparticle range.

=== Pre-industrial technology ===
Nanoparticles were used by artisans since prehistory, albeit without knowledge of their nature. They were used by glassmakers and potters in Classical Antiquity, as exemplified by the Roman Lycurgus cup of dichroic glass (4th century CE) and the lusterware pottery of Mesopotamia (9th century CE). The latter is characterized by silver and copper nanoparticles dispersed in the glassy glaze.

=== 19th century ===
Michael Faraday provided the first description, in scientific terms, of the optical properties of nanometer-scale metals in his classic 1857 paper. In a subsequent paper, the author (Turner) points out that: "It is well known that when thin leaves of gold or silver are mounted upon glass and heated to a temperature that is well below a red heat (~500 °C), a remarkable change of properties takes place, whereby the continuity of the metallic film is destroyed. The result is that white light is now freely transmitted, reflection is correspondingly diminished, while the electrical resistivity is enormously increased."

=== 20th century ===
During the 1970s and 80s, when the first thorough fundamental studies with nanoparticles were underway in the United States by Granqvist and Buhrman and Japan within an ERATO Project, researchers used the term ultrafine particles. However, during the 1990s, when the National Nanotechnology Initiative was launched in the United States, the term nanoparticle became more common, for example, see the same senior author's paper 20 years later addressing the same issue, lognormal distribution of sizes.

== Morphology and structure ==
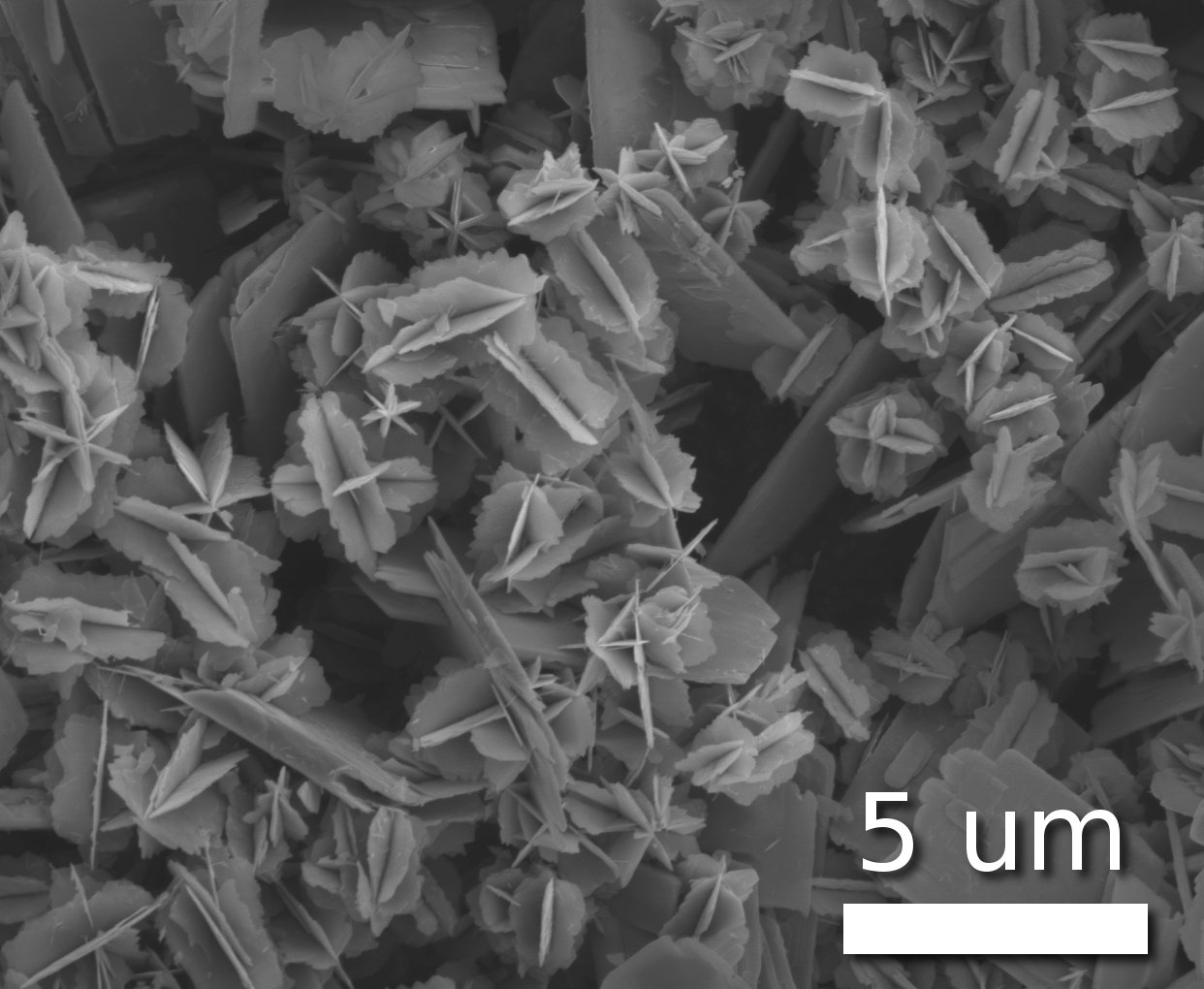
Nanostars of vanadium(IV) oxide (VO_{2}) exhibiting a crystal clusters structure resembling that of desert roses

Nanoparticles occur in a great variety of shapes, which have been given many names such as nanospheres, nanorods, nanochains, decahedral nanoparticles, nanostars, nanoflowers, nanoreefs, nanowhiskers, nanofibers, and nanoboxes.

The shapes of nanoparticles may be determined by the intrinsic crystal habit of the material, or by the influence of the environment around their creation, such as the inhibition of crystal growth on certain faces by coating additives, the shape of emulsion droplets and micelles in the precursor preparation, or the shape of pores in a surrounding solid matrix. Some applications of nanoparticles require specific shapes, as well as specific sizes or size ranges.

Amorphous particles typically adopt a spherical shape (due to their microstructural isotropy).

=== Variations ===
Semi-solid and soft nanoparticles have been produced. A prototype nanoparticle of semi-solid nature is the liposome. Various types of liposome nanoparticles are currently used clinically as delivery systems for anticancer drugs and vaccines.

The breakdown of biopolymers into their nanoscale building blocks is considered a potential route to produce nanoparticles with enhanced biocompatibility and biodegradability. The most common example is the production of nanocellulose from wood pulp. Other examples are nanolignin, nanochitin, or nanostarches.

Nanoparticles with one half hydrophilic and the other half hydrophobic are termed Janus particles and are particularly effective for stabilizing emulsions. They can self-assemble at water/oil interfaces and act as pickering stabilizers.

Hydrogel nanoparticles made of N-isopropylacrylamide hydrogel core shell can be dyed with affinity baits, internally. These affinity baits allow the nanoparticles to isolate and remove undesirable proteins while enhancing the target analytes.

== Nucleation and growth ==
=== Impact of nucleation ===
Nucleation lays the foundation for the nanoparticle synthesis. Initial nuclei play a vital role on the size and shape of the nanoparticles that will ultimately form by acting as templating nuclei for the nanoparticle itself. Long-term stability is also determined by the initial nucleation procedures. Homogeneous nucleation occurs when nuclei form uniformly throughout the parent phase and is less common. Heterogeneous nucleation, however, forms on areas such as container surfaces, impurities, and other defects. Crystals can form simultaneously when nucleation occurs rapidly, resulting in a more uniform (monodisperse) product. In contrast, slow nucleation rates often lead to a diverse (polydisperse) population of crystals with varying sizes. This phenomenon is exemplified in the formation of CaCO_{3} crystals. Controlling nucleation allows for the control of size, dispersity, and phase of nanoparticles.

The process of nucleation and growth within nanoparticles can be described by nucleation, Ostwald ripening or the two-step mechanism-autocatalysis model.

=== Nucleation ===
The original theory from 1927 of nucleation in nanoparticle formation was Classical Nucleation Theory (CNT). It was believed that the changes in particle size could be described by burst nucleation alone. In 1950, Viktor LaMer used CNT as the nucleation basis for his model of nanoparticle growth. There are three portions to the LaMer model: 1. Rapid increase in the concentration of free monomers in solution, 2. fast nucleation of the monomer characterized by explosive growth of particles, 3. Growth of particles controlled by diffusion of the monomer. This model describes that the growth on the nucleus is spontaneous but limited by diffusion of the precursor to the nuclei surface. The LaMer model has not been able to explain the kinetics of nucleation in any modern system.

=== Ostwald ripening ===
Ostwald ripening is a process in which large particles grow at the expense of the smaller particles as a result of dissolution of small particles and deposition of the dissolved molecules on the surfaces of the larger particles. It occurs because smaller particles have a higher surface energy than larger particles. This process is typically undesirable in nanoparticle synthesis as it negatively impacts the functionality of nanoparticles.

=== Two-step mechanism – autocatalysis model ===
In 1997, Finke and Watzky proposed a new kinetic model for the nucleation and growth of nanoparticles. This 2-step model suggested that constant slow nucleation (occurring far from supersaturation) is followed by autocatalytic growth where dispersity of nanoparticles is largely determined. This F-W (Finke-Watzky) 2-step model provides a firmer mechanistic basis for the design of nanoparticles with a focus on size, shape, and dispersity control. The model was later expanded to a 3-step and two 4-step models between 2004 and 2008. Here, an additional step was included to account for small particle aggregation, where two smaller particles could aggregate to form a larger particle. Next, a fourth step (another autocatalytic step) was added to account for a small particle agglomerating with a larger particle. Finally in 2014, an alternative fourth step was considered that accounted for a atomistic surface growth on a large particle.

=== Measuring the rate of nucleation ===
As of 2014, the classical nucleation theory explained that the nucleation rate will correspond to the driving force. One method for measuring the nucleation rate is through the induction time method. This process uses the stochastic nature of nucleation and determines the rate of nucleation by analysis of the time between constant supersaturation and when crystals are first detected. Another method includes the probability distribution model, analogous to the methods used to study supercooled liquids, where the probability of finding at least one nucleus at a given time is derived.

As of 2019, the early stages of nucleation and the rates associated with nucleation were modelled through multiscale computational modeling. This included exploration into an improved kinetic rate equation model and density function studies using the phase-field crystal model.

== Properties ==
The properties of a material in nanoparticle form are unusually different from those of the bulk one even when divided into micrometer-size particles. Many of them arise from spatial confinement of sub-atomic particles (i.e. electrons, protons, photons) and electric fields around these particles. The large surface to volume ratio is also significant factor at this scale.

=== Controlling properties ===
The initial nucleation stages of the synthesis process heavily influence the properties of a nanoparticle. Nucleation, for example, is vital to the size of the nanoparticle. A critical radius must be met in the initial stages of solid formation, or the particles will redissolve into the liquid phase. The final shape of a nanoparticle is also controlled by nucleation. Possible final morphologies created by nucleation can include spherical, cubic, needle-like, worm-like, and more particles. Nucleation can be controlled predominately by time and temperature as well as the supersaturation of the liquid phase and the environment of the synthesis overall.

=== Large surface-area-to-volume ratio ===
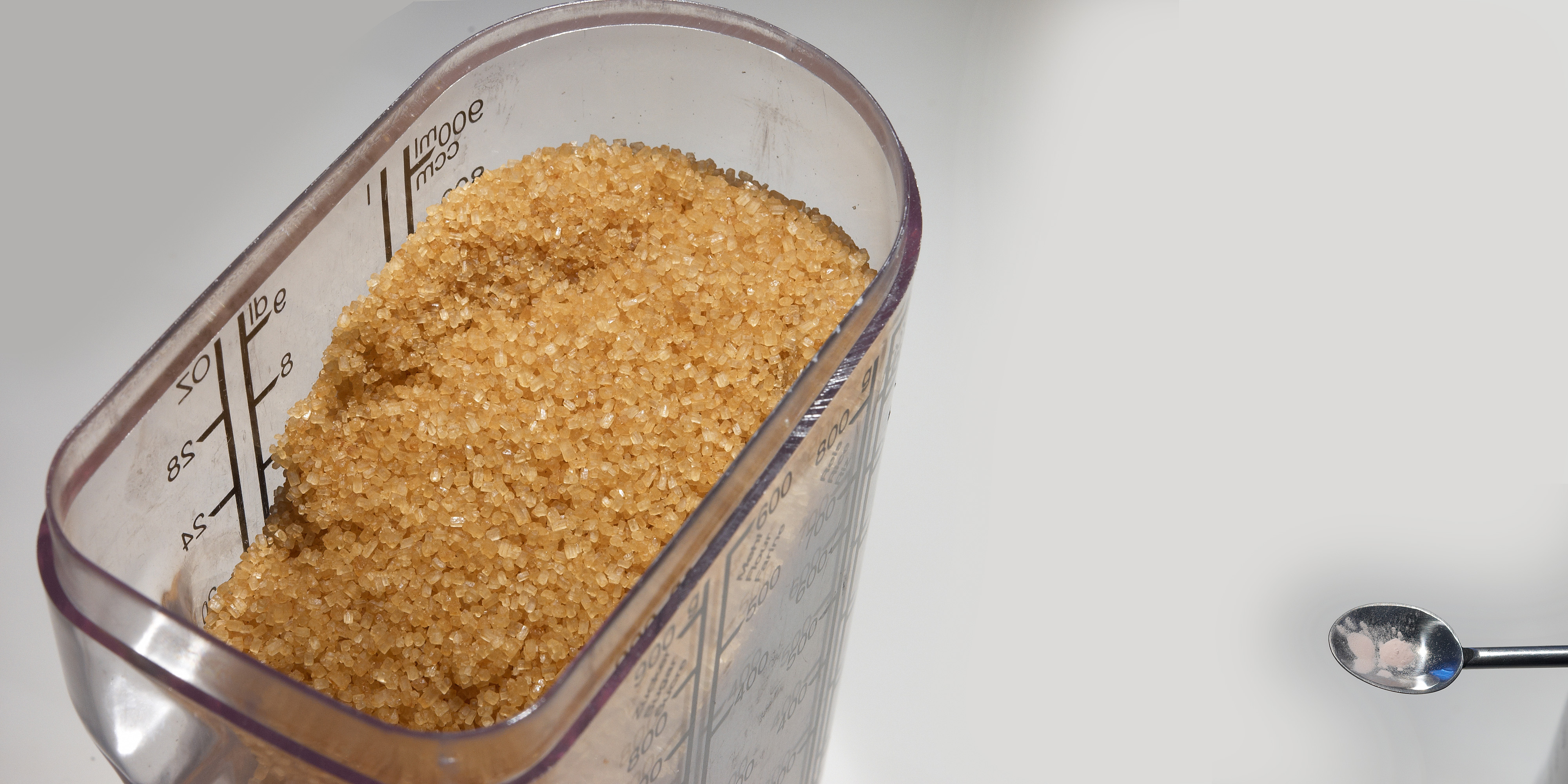
1 kg of particles of 1 mm^{3} has the same surface area as 1 mg of particles of 1 nm^{3}

Bulk materials (>100 nm in size) are expected to have constant physical properties (such as thermal and electrical conductivity, stiffness, density, and viscosity) regardless of their size, for nanoparticles, however, this is different: the volume of the surface layer (a few atomic diameters-wide) becomes a significant fraction of the particle's volume; whereas that fraction is insignificant for particles with a diameter of one micrometer or more. In other words, the surface area/volume ratio impacts certain properties of the nanoparticles more prominently than in bulk particles.

=== Interfacial layer ===
For nanoparticles dispersed in a medium of different composition, the interfacial layer — formed by ions and molecules from the medium that are within a few atomic diameters of the surface of each particle — can mask or change its chemical and physical properties. Indeed, that layer can be considered an integral part of each nanoparticle.

=== Solvent affinity ===
Suspensions of nanoparticles are possible since the interaction of the particle surface with the solvent is strong enough to overcome density differences, which otherwise usually result in a material either sinking or floating in a liquid.

=== Coatings ===
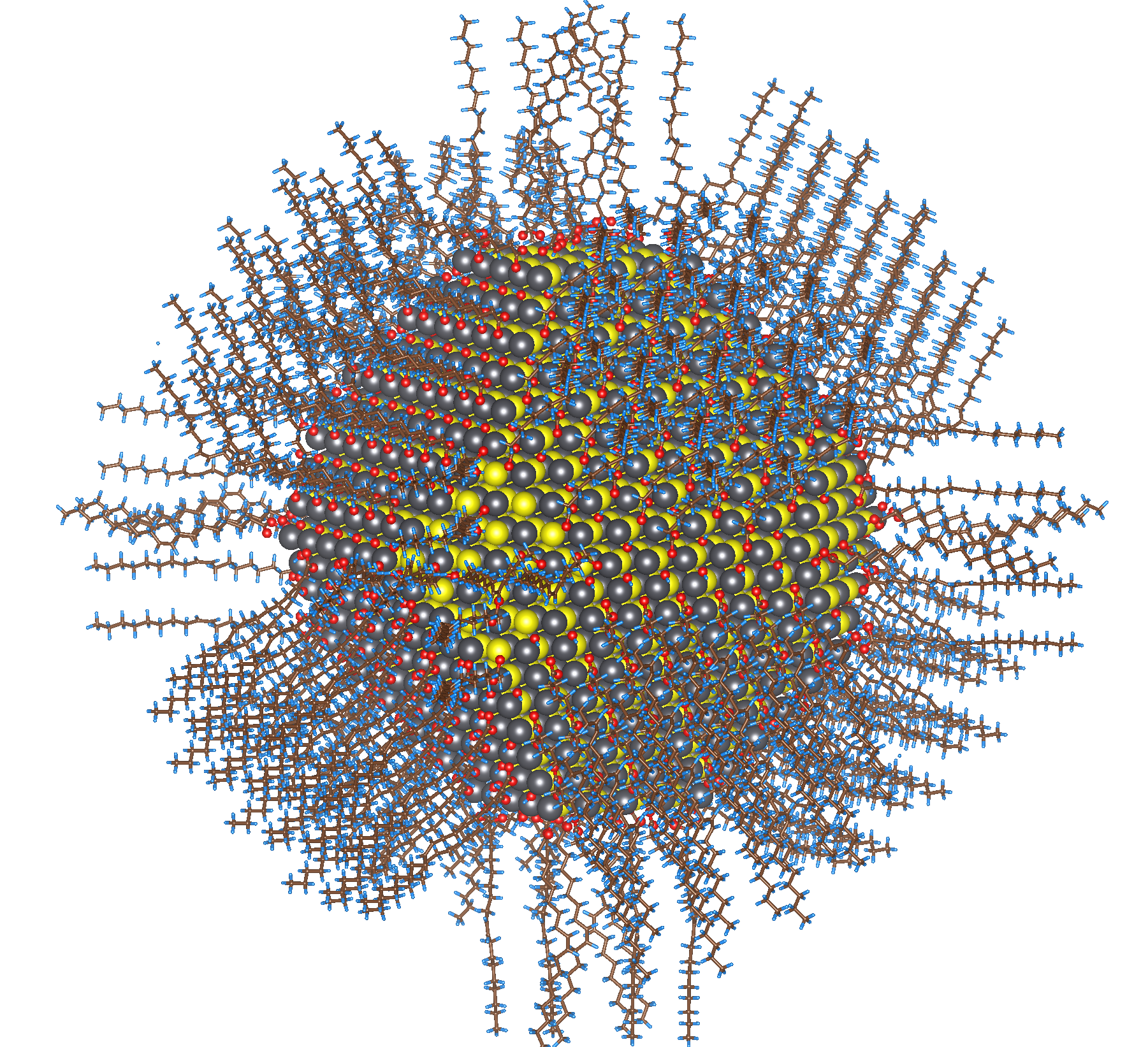
Semiconductor nanoparticle (quantum dot) of lead sulfide with complete passivation by oleic acid, oleyl amine and hydroxyl ligands (size ~5nm)

Nanoparticles often develop or receive coatings of other substances, distinct from both the particle's material and of the surrounding medium. Even when only a single molecule thick, these coatings can radically change the particles' properties, such as and chemical reactivity, catalytic activity, and stability in suspension.

=== Diffusion across the surface ===
The high surface area of a material in nanoparticle form allows heat, molecules, and ions to diffuse into or out of the particles at very large rates. The small particle diameter, on the other hand, allows the whole material to reach homogeneous equilibrium with respect to diffusion in a very short time. Thus many processes that depend on diffusion, such as sintering can take place at lower temperatures and over shorter time scales which can be important in catalysis.

=== Ferromagnetic and ferroelectric effects ===
The small size of nanoparticles affects their magnetic and electric properties. The ferromagnetic materials in the micrometer range is a good example: widely used in magnetic recording media, for the stability of their magnetization state, those particles smaller than 10 nm are unstable and can change their state (flip) as the result of thermal energy at ordinary temperatures, thus making them unsuitable for that application.

=== Mechanical properties ===
The reduced vacancy concentration in nanocrystals can negatively affect the motion of dislocations, since dislocation climb requires vacancy migration. In addition, there exists a very high internal pressure due to the surface stress present in small nanoparticles with high radii of curvature. This causes a lattice strain that is inversely proportional to the size of the particle, also well known to impede dislocation motion, in the same way as it does in the work hardening of materials. For example, gold nanoparticles are significantly harder than the bulk material. Furthermore, the high surface-to-volume ratio in nanoparticles makes dislocations more likely to interact with the particle surface. In particular, this affects the nature of the dislocation source and allows the dislocations to escape the particle before they can multiply, reducing the dislocation density and thus the extent of plastic deformation.

There are unique challenges associated with the measurement of mechanical properties on the nanoscale, as conventional means such as the universal testing machine cannot be employed. As a result, new techniques such as nanoindentation have been developed that complement existing electron microscope and scanning probe methods. Atomic force microscopy (AFM) can be used to perform nanoindentation to measure hardness, elastic modulus, and adhesion between nanoparticle and substrate. The particle deformation can be measured by the deflection of the cantilever tip over the sample. The resulting force-displacement curves can be used to calculate elastic modulus. However, it is unclear whether particle size and indentation depth affect the measured elastic modulus of nanoparticles by AFM.

Adhesion and friction forces are important considerations in nanofabrication, lubrication, device design, colloidal stabilization, and drug delivery. The capillary force is the main contributor to the adhesive force under ambient conditions. The adhesion and friction force can be obtained from the cantilever deflection if the AFM tip is regarded as a nanoparticle. However, this method is limited by tip material and geometric shape. The colloidal probe technique overcomes these issues by attaching a nanoparticle to the AFM tip, allowing control oversize, shape, and material. While the colloidal probe technique is an effective method for measuring adhesion force, it remains difficult to attach a single nanoparticle smaller than 1 micron onto the AFM force sensor.

Another technique is in situ TEM, which provides real-time, high resolution imaging of nanostructure response to a stimulus. For example, an in situ force probe holder in TEM was used to compress twinned nanoparticles and characterize yield strength. In general, the measurement of the mechanical properties of nanoparticles is influenced by many factors including uniform dispersion of nanoparticles, precise application of load, minimum particle deformation, calibration, and calculation model.

Like bulk materials, the properties of nanoparticles are materials dependent. For spherical polymer nanoparticles, glass transition temperature and crystallinity may affect deformation and change the elastic modulus when compared to the bulk material. However, size-dependent behavior of elastic moduli could not be generalized across polymers. As for crystalline metal nanoparticles, dislocations were found to influence the mechanical properties of nanoparticles, contradicting the conventional view that dislocations are absent in crystalline nanoparticles.

=== Melting point depression ===
A material may have lower melting point in nanoparticle form than in the bulk form. For example, 2.5 nm gold nanoparticles melt at about 300 °C, whereas bulk gold melts at 1064 °C.

=== Quantum mechanics effects ===
Quantum mechanics effects become noticeable for nanoscale objects. They include quantum confinement in semiconductor particles, localized surface plasmons in some metal particles, and superparamagnetism in magnetic materials. Quantum dots are nanoparticles of semiconducting material that are small enough (typically sub 10 nm or less) to have quantized electronic energy levels.

Quantum effects are responsible for the deep-red to black color of gold or silicon nanopowders and nanoparticle suspensions. Absorption of solar radiation is much higher in materials composed of nanoparticles than in thin films of continuous sheets of material. In both solar PV and solar thermal applications, by controlling the size, shape, and material of the particles, it is possible to control solar absorption.

Core-shell nanoparticles can support simultaneously both electric and magnetic resonances, demonstrating entirely new properties when compared with bare metallic nanoparticles if the resonances are properly engineered. The formation of the core-shell structure from two different metals enables an energy exchange between the core and the shell, typically found in upconverting nanoparticles and downconverting nanoparticles, and causes a shift in the emission wavelength spectrum.

By introducing a dielectric layer, plasmonic core (metal)-shell (dielectric) nanoparticles enhance light absorption by increasing scattering. Recently, the metal core-dielectric shell nanoparticle has demonstrated a zero backward scattering with enhanced forward scattering on a silicon substrate when surface plasmon is located in front of a solar cell.

=== Regular packing ===
Nanoparticles of sufficiently uniform size may spontaneously settle into regular arrangements, forming a colloidal crystal. These arrangements may exhibit original physical properties, such as observed in photonic crystals.

== Production ==
Artificial nanoparticles can be created from any solid or liquid material, including metals, dielectrics, and semiconductors. They may be internally homogeneous or heterogenous, e.g. with a core–shell structure.

There are several methods for creating nanoparticles, including gas condensation, attrition, chemical precipitation, ion implantation, pyrolysis, hydrothermal synthesis, and biosynthesis.

=== Mechanical ===
Friable macro- or micro-scale solid particles can be ground in a ball mill, a planetary ball mill, or other size-reducing mechanism until enough of them are in the nanoscale size range. The resulting powder can be air classified to extract the nanoparticles.

=== Breakdown of biopolymers ===
Biopolymers like cellulose, lignin, chitin, or starch may be broken down into their individual nanoscale building blocks, obtaining anisotropic fiber- or needle-like nanoparticles. The biopolymers are disintegrated mechanically in combination with chemical oxidation or enzymatic treatment to promote breakup, or hydrolysed using acid.

=== Pyrolysis ===
Another method to create nanoparticles is to turn a suitable precursor substance, such as a gas (e.g. methane) or aerosol, into solid particles by combustion or pyrolysis. This is a generalization of the burning of hydrocarbons or other organic vapors to generate soot. Traditional pyrolysis often results in aggregates and agglomerates rather than single primary particles. This inconvenience can be avoided by ultrasonic nozzle spray pyrolysis, in which the precursor liquid is forced through an orifice at high pressure.

=== Condensation from plasma ===
Nanoparticles of pure metals, oxides, carbides, and nitrides, can be created by vaporizing a solid precursor with a thermal plasma and then condensing the vapor by expansion or quenching in a suitable gas or liquid. The plasma can be produced by dc jet, electric arc, or radio frequency (RF) induction. The thermal plasma can reach temperatures of 10.000 K and can thus also synthesize nanopowders with very high boiling points. Metal wires can be vaporized by the exploding wire method.

In RF induction plasma torches, energy coupling to the plasma is accomplished through the electromagnetic field generated by the induction coil. The plasma gas does not come in contact with electrodes, thus eliminating possible sources of contamination and allowing the operation of such plasma torches with a wide range of gases including inert, reducing, oxidizing, and other corrosive atmospheres. The working frequency is typically between 200 kHz and 40 MHz. Laboratory units run at power levels in the order of 30–50 kW, whereas the large-scale industrial units have been tested at power levels up to 1 MW. As the residence time of the injected feed droplets in the plasma is very short, it is important that the droplet sizes are small enough in order to obtain complete evaporation.

=== Inert gas condensation ===
Inert-gas condensation is frequently used to produce metallic nanoparticles. The metal is evaporated in a vacuum chamber containing a reduced atmosphere of an inert gas. Condensation of the supersaturated metal vapor results in creation of nanometer-size particles, which can be entrained in the inert gas stream and deposited on a substrate or studied in situ. Early studies were based on thermal evaporation. Using magnetron sputtering to create the metal vapor allows to achieve higher yields. The method can easily be generalized to alloy nanoparticles by choosing appropriate metallic targets. The use of sequential growth schemes, where the particles travel through a second metallic vapor, results in growth of core-shell (CS) structures.

=== Radiolysis method ===
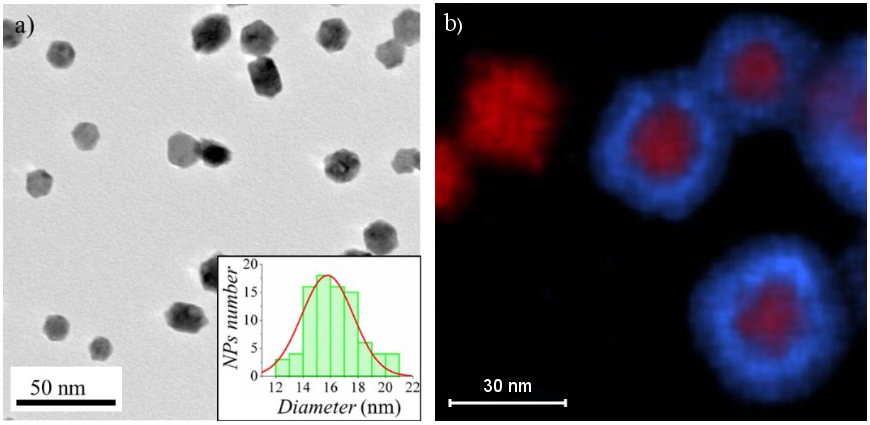
a) Transmission electron microscopy (TEM) image of Hf nanoparticles grown by magnetron-sputtering inert-gas condensation (inset: size distribution) and b) energy dispersive X-ray (EDX) mapping of Ni and Ni@Cu core@shell nanoparticles.

Nanoparticles can also be formed using radiation chemistry. Radiolysis from gamma rays can create strongly active free radicals in solution. This relatively simple technique uses a minimum number of chemicals. These including water, a soluble metallic salt, a radical scavenger (often a secondary alcohol), and a surfactant (organic capping agent). High gamma doses on the order of 10^{4} gray are required. In this process, reducing radicals will drop metallic ions down to the zero-valence state. A scavenger chemical will preferentially interact with oxidizing radicals to prevent the re-oxidation of the metal. Once in the zero-valence state, metal atoms begin to coalesce into particles. A chemical surfactant surrounds the particle during formation and regulates its growth. In sufficient concentrations, the surfactant molecules stay attached to the particle. This prevents it from dissociating or forming clusters with other particles. Formation of nanoparticles using the radiolysis method allows for tailoring of particle size and shape by adjusting precursor concentrations and gamma dose.

=== Wet chemistry ===
Nanoparticles of certain materials can be created by "wet" chemical processes, in which solutions of suitable compounds are mixed or otherwise treated to form an insoluble precipitate of the desired material. The size of the particles of the latter is adjusted by choosing the concentration of the reagents and the temperature of the solutions, and through the addition of suitable inert agents that affect the viscosity and diffusion rate of the liquid. With different parameters, the same general process may yield other nanoscale structures of the same material, such as aerogels and other porous networks.

The nanoparticles formed by this method are then separated from the solvent and soluble byproducts of the reaction by a combination of evaporation, sedimentation, centrifugation, washing, and filtration. Alternatively, if the particles are meant to be deposited on the surface of some solid substrate, the starting solutions can be by coated on that surface by dipping or spin-coating, and the reaction can be carried out in place.

Electroless deposition provides a unique opportunity for growing nanoparticles onto surface without the need for costly spin coating, electrodeposition, or physical vapor deposition. Electroless deposition processes can form colloid suspensions catalytic metal or metal oxide deposition. The suspension of nanoparticles that result from this process is an example of colloid. Typical instances of this method are the production of metal oxide or hydroxide nanoparticles by hydrolysis of metal alkoxides and chlorides.

Besides being cheap and convenient, the wet chemical approach allows fine control of the particle's chemical composition. Even small quantities of dopants, such as organic dyes and rare earth metals, can be introduced in the reagent solutions end up uniformly dispersed in the final product.

=== Ion implantation ===
Ion implantation may be used to treat the surfaces of dielectric materials such as sapphire and silica to make composites with near-surface dispersions of metal or oxide nanoparticles.

=== Functionalization ===
Many properties of nanoparticles, notably stability, solubility, and chemical or biological activity, can be radically altered by coating them with various substances — a process called functionalization. Functionalized nanomaterial-based catalysts can be used for catalysis of many known organic reactions.

For example, suspensions of graphene particles can be stabilized by functionalization with gallic acid groups.

For biological applications, the surface coating should be polar to give high aqueous solubility and prevent nanoparticle aggregation. In serum or on the cell surface, highly charged coatings promote non-specific binding, whereas polyethylene glycol linked to terminal hydroxyl or methoxy groups repel non-specific interactions. By the immobilization of thiol groups on the surface of nanoparticles or by coating them with thiomers high (muco)adhesive and cellular uptake enhancing properties can be introduced.

Nanoparticles can be linked to biological molecules that can act as address tags, directing them to specific sites within the body specific organelles within the cell, or causing them to follow specifically the movement of individual protein or RNA molecules in living cells. Common address tags are monoclonal antibodies, aptamers, streptavidin, or peptides. These targeting agents should ideally be covalently linked to the nanoparticle and should be present in a controlled number per nanoparticle. Multivalent nanoparticles, bearing multiple targeting groups, can cluster receptors, which can activate cellular signaling pathways, and give stronger anchoring. Monovalent nanoparticles, bearing a single binding site, avoid clustering and so are preferable for tracking the behavior of individual proteins.

It has been shown that catalytic activity and sintering rates of a functionalized nanoparticle catalyst is correlated to nanoparticles' number density

Coatings that mimic those of red blood cells can help nanoparticles evade the immune system.

=== Uniformity requirements ===
The chemical processing and synthesis of high-performance technological components for the private, industrial, and military sectors requires the use of high-purity ceramics (oxide ceramics, such as aluminium oxide or copper(II) oxide), polymers, glass-ceramics, and composite materials, as metal carbides (SiC), nitrides (Aluminum nitrides, Silicon nitride), metals (Al, Cu), non-metals (graphite, carbon nanotubes), and layered (Al + aluminium carbonate, Cu + C). In condensed bodies formed from fine powders, the irregular particle sizes and shapes in a typical powder often lead to non-uniform packing morphologies that result in packing density variations in the powder compact.

Uncontrolled agglomeration of powders due to attractive van der Waals forces can also give rise to microstructural heterogeneity. Differential stresses that develop as a result of non-uniform drying shrinkage are directly related to the rate at which the solvent can be removed, and thus highly dependent upon the distribution of porosity. Such stresses have been associated with a plastic-to-brittle transition in consolidated bodies, and can yield to crack propagation in the unfired body if not relieved.

In addition, any fluctuations in packing density in the compact as it is prepared for the kiln are often amplified during the sintering process, yielding inhomogeneous densification. Some pores and other structural defects associated with density variations have been shown to play a detrimental role in the sintering process by growing and thus limiting end-point densities. Differential stresses arising from inhomogeneous densification have also been shown to result in the propagation of internal cracks, thus becoming the strength-controlling flaws.

Inert gas evaporation and inert gas deposition are free many of these defects due to the distillation (cf. purification) nature of the process and having enough time to form single crystal particles, however even their non-aggreated deposits have lognormal size distribution, which is typical with nanoparticles. The reason why modern gas evaporation techniques can produce a relatively narrow size distribution is that aggregation can be avoided. However, even in this case, random residence times in the growth zone, due to the combination of drift and diffusion, result in a size distribution appearing lognormal.

It would, therefore, appear desirable to process a material in such a way that it is physically uniform with regard to the distribution of components and porosity, rather than using particle size distributions that will maximize the green density. The containment of a uniformly dispersed assembly of strongly interacting particles in suspension requires total control over interparticle forces. Monodisperse nanoparticles and colloids provide this potential.

== Characterization ==
Nanoparticles have different analytical requirements than conventional chemicals, for which chemical composition and concentration are sufficient metrics. Nanoparticles have other physical properties that must be measured for a complete description, such as size, shape, surface properties, crystallinity, and dispersion state. Additionally, sampling and laboratory procedures can perturb their dispersion state or bias the distribution of other properties. In environmental contexts, an additional challenge is that many methods cannot detect low concentrations of nanoparticles that may still have an adverse effect. For some applications, nanoparticles may be characterized in complex matrices such as water, soil, food, polymers, inks, complex mixtures of organic liquids such as in cosmetics, or blood.

There are several overall categories of methods used to characterize nanoparticles. Microscopy methods generate images of individual nanoparticles to characterize their shape, size, and location. Electron microscopy and scanning probe microscopy are the dominant methods. Because nanoparticles have a size below the diffraction limit of visible light, conventional optical microscopy is not useful. Electron microscopes can be coupled to spectroscopic methods that can perform elemental analysis. Microscopy methods are destructive and can be prone to undesirable artifacts from sample preparation, or from probe tip geometry in the case of scanning probe microscopy. Additionally, microscopy is based on single-particle measurements, meaning that large numbers of individual particles must be characterized to estimate their bulk properties.

Spectroscopy, which measures the particles' interaction with electromagnetic radiation as a function of wavelength, is useful for some classes of nanoparticles to characterize concentration, size, and shape. X-ray, ultraviolet–visible, infrared, and nuclear magnetic resonance spectroscopy can be used with nanoparticles. Light-scattering methods using laser light, X-rays, or neutron scattering are used to determine particle size, with each method suitable for different size ranges and particle compositions. Some miscellaneous methods are electrophoresis for surface charge, the Brunauer–Emmett–Teller method for surface area, and X-ray diffraction for crystal structure, as well as mass spectrometry for particle mass, and particle counters for particle number. Chromatography, centrifugation, and filtration techniques can be used to separate nanoparticles by size or other physical properties before or during characterization.

== Health and safety ==
Nanoparticles present possible dangers, both medically and environmentally. Most of these are due to the high surface to volume ratio, which can make the particles very reactive or catalytic. They are also thought to aggregate on phospholipid bilayers and pass through cell membranes in organisms, and their interactions with biological systems are relatively unknown. However, it is unlikely the particles would enter the cell nucleus, Golgi complex, endoplasmic reticulum or other internal cellular components due to the particle size and intercellular agglomeration. A recent study looking at the effects of ZnO nanoparticles on human immune cells has found varying levels of susceptibility to cytotoxicity. There are concerns that pharmaceutical companies, seeking regulatory approval for nano-reformulations of existing medicines, are relying on safety data produced during clinical studies of the earlier, pre-reformulation version of the medicine. This could result in regulatory bodies, such as the FDA, missing new side effects that are specific to the nano-reformulation. However considerable research has demonstrated that zinc nanoparticles are not absorbed into the bloodstream in vivo.

Concern has also been raised over the health effects of respirable nanoparticles from certain combustion processes. Preclinical investigations have demonstrated that some inhaled or injected noble metal nano-architectures avoid persistence in organisms. As of 2013 the U.S. Environmental Protection Agency was investigating the safety of the following nanoparticles:

- Carbon nanotubes: Carbon materials have a wide range of uses, ranging from composites for use in vehicles and sports equipment to integrated circuits for electronic components. The interactions between nanomaterials such as carbon nanotubes and natural organic matter strongly influence both their aggregation and deposition, which strongly affects their transport, transformation, and exposure in aquatic environments. In past research, carbon nanotubes exhibited some toxicological impacts that will be evaluated in various environmental settings in current EPA chemical safety research. EPA research will provide data, models, test methods, and best practices to discover the acute health effects of carbon nanotubes and identify methods to predict them.
- Cerium oxide: Nanoscale cerium oxide is used in electronics, biomedical supplies, energy, and fuel additives. Many applications of engineered cerium oxide nanoparticles naturally disperse themselves into the environment, which increases the risk of exposure. There is ongoing exposure to new diesel emissions using fuel additives containing CeO_{2} nanoparticles, and the environmental and public health impacts of this new technology are unknown. EPA's chemical safety research is assessing the environmental, ecological, and health implications of nanotechnology-enabled diesel fuel additives.
- Titanium dioxide: Nano titanium dioxide is currently used in many products. Depending on the type of particle, it may be found in sunscreens, cosmetics, and paints and coatings. It is also being investigated for use in removing contaminants from drinking water.
- Nano Silver: Nano Silver is being incorporated into textiles, clothing, food packaging, and other materials to eliminate bacteria. EPA and the U.S. Consumer Product Safety Commission are studying certain products to see whether they transfer nano-size silver particles in real-world scenarios. EPA is researching this topic to better understand how much nano-silver children come in contact with in their environments.
- Iron: While nano-scale iron is being investigated for many uses, including "smart fluids" for uses such as optics polishing and as a better-absorbed iron nutrient supplement, one of its more prominent current uses is to remove contamination from groundwater. This use, supported by EPA research, is being piloted at a number of sites across the United States.

== Regulation ==
As of 2016, the U.S. Environmental Protection Agency had conditionally registered, for a period of four years, only two nanomaterial pesticides as ingredients. The EPA differentiates nanoscale ingredients from non-nanoscale forms of the ingredient, but there is little scientific data about potential variation in toxicity. Testing protocols still need to be developed.

== Applications ==
As the most prevalent morphology of nanomaterials used in consumer products, nanoparticles have an enormous range of potential and actual applications. Table below summarizes the most common nanoparticles used in various product types available on the global markets.

Scientific research on nanoparticles is intense as they have many potential applications in pre-clinical and clinical medicine, physics, optics, and electronics. The U.S. National Nanotechnology Initiative offers government funding focused on nanoparticle research. The use of nanoparticles in laser dye-doped poly(methyl methacrylate) (PMMA) laser gain media was demonstrated in 2003 and it has been shown to improve conversion efficiencies and to decrease laser beam divergence. Researchers attribute the reduction in beam divergence to improved dn/dT characteristics of the organic-inorganic dye-doped nanocomposite. The optimum composition reported by these researchers is 30% w/w of SiO_{2} (~ 12 nm) in dye-doped PMMA. Nanoparticles are being investigated as a potential drug delivery system. Drugs, growth factors or other biomolecules can be conjugated to nano particles to aid targeted delivery. This nanoparticle-assisted delivery allows for spatial and temporal controls of the loaded drugs to achieve the most desirable biological outcome. Nanoparticles are also studied for possible applications as dietary supplements for delivery of biologically active substances, for example mineral elements.

=== Polymer reinforcement ===
Clay nanoparticles, when incorporated into polymer matrices, increase reinforcement, leading to stronger plastics, verifiable by a higher glass transition temperature and other mechanical property tests. These nanoparticles are hard, and impart their properties to the polymer (plastic). Nanoparticles have also been attached to textile fibers in order to create smart and functional clothing.

=== Liquid properties tuner ===
The inclusion of nanoparticles in a solid or liquid medium can substantially change its mechanical properties, such as elasticity, plasticity, viscosity, compressibility.

=== Photocatalysis ===
Semiconductor nanoparticles can offer a high surface-area-to-volume ratio, providing abundant surface sites for photocatalytic reactions. Their small dimensions can also shorten the distance that photogenerated charge carriers must travel to reach the surface, potentially reducing bulk recombination. Both inorganic and organic semiconductor nanoparticles, including those composed of conjugated polymers or small organic molecules, have been investigated for photocatalytic applications such as hydrogen evolution.

=== Road paving ===
Asphalt modification through nanoparticles can be considered as an interesting low-cost technique in asphalt pavement engineering providing novel perspectives in making asphalt materials more durable.

=== Biomedical ===
Nanoscale particles are used in biomedical applications as drug carriers or imaging contrast agents in microscopy. Anisotropic nanoparticles are a good candidate in biomolecular detection. They can also provide label-free sensing of biomolecules in nanoantenna devices. Moreover, nanoparticles for nucleic acid delivery offer an unprecedented opportunity to overcome some drawbacks related to the delivery, owing to their tunability with diverse physico-chemical properties, they can readily be functionalized with any type of biomolecules/moieties for selective targeting.

Using nanoparticles in cancer treatment is being extensively researched. Certain characteristics of the tumor microenvironment, including leaky vasculature and poor lymphatic drainage, lead to the accumulation of NPs in the tumor. This is known as the enhanced permeability and retention (EPR) effect, and is a type of passive targeting. Additionally, ligands that bind to certain expressed or over-expressed receptors in the tumor microenvironment can be conjugated to the surface of nanoparticles to actively target the tumor. The accumulation of nanoparticles in the tumor can reduce adverse side effects, which is a major drawback of chemotherapy.

In drug delivery, the acidic pH of the tumor microenvironment is often exploited to increase the release of the drug from pH-sensitive materials. Additionally, some NPs can generate heat under laser irradiation (photothermal therapy) or alternating magnetic field (magnetic hyperthermia), which can both kill cancer cells, and release drugs loaded in the nanoparticle.

Some high-Z metal NPs are currently being investigated as radiosensitizers to enhance the effects of radiation therapy in cancer treatment.

=== Sunscreens ===
Titanium dioxide nanoparticles imparts what is known as the self-cleaning effect, which lend useful water-repellant and antibacterial properties to paints and other products. Zinc oxide nanoparticles have been found to have superior UV blocking properties and are widely used in the preparation of sunscreen lotions, being completely photostable though toxic.

=== Compounds by industrial area ===
Various nanoparticle chemical compounds which are commonly used in the consumer products by industrial sectors
No.	Industrial sectors	Nanoparticles
1	agriculture	silver; silicon dioxide; potassium; calcium; iron; zinc; phosphorus; boron; zinc oxide; molybdenum
2	automotive	tungsten disulfide; silicon dioxide; clay; titanium dioxide; diamond; copper; cobalt oxide; zinc oxide; boron nitride; zirconium dioxide; tungsten; γ-aluminium oxide; boron; palladium; platinum; cerium(IV) oxide; carnauba; aluminium oxide; silver; calcium carbonate; calcium sulfonate
3	construction	titanium dioxide; silicon dioxide; silver; clay; aluminium oxide; calcium carbonate; calcium silicate hydrate; carbon; aluminium phosphate; cerium(IV) oxide; calcium hydroxide
4	cosmetics	silver; titanium dioxide; gold; carbon; zinc oxide; silicon dioxide; clay; sodium silicate; kojic acid; hydroxycarboxylic acid
5	electronics	silver; aluminum; silicon dioxide; palladium
6	environment	silver; titanium dioxide; carbon; manganese oxide; clay; gold; selenium
7	food	silver; clay; titanium dioxide; gold; zinc oxide; silicon dioxide; calcium; copper; zinc; platinum; manganese; palladium; carbon
8	home appliance	silver; zinc oxide; silicon dioxide; diamond; titanium dioxide
9	medicine	silver; gold; hydroxyapatite; clay; titanium dioxide; silicon dioxide; zirconium dioxide; carbon; diamond; aluminium oxide; ytterbium trifluoride
10	petroleum	tungsten disulfide; zinc oxide; silicon dioxide; diamond; clay; boron; boron nitride; silver; titanium dioxide; tungsten; γ-aluminium oxide; carbon; molybdenum disulfide
11	printing	toner, deposited by a printer onto paper or other substrate
12	renewable energies	titanium; palladium; tungsten disulfide; silicon dioxide; clay; graphite; zirconium(IV) oxide-yttria stabilized; carbon; gd-doped-cerium(IV) oxide; nickel cobalt oxide; nickel(II) oxide; rhodium; sm-doped-cerium(IV) oxide; barium strontium titanate; silver
13	sports and fitness	silver; titanium dioxide; gold; clay; carbon
14	textile	silver; carbon; titanium dioxide; copper sulfide; clay; gold; polyethylene terephthalate; silicon dioxide

== See also ==
- Carbon quantum dot
- Ceramic engineering
- Coating
- Colloid
- Colloidal crystal
- Colloidal gold
- Colloid-facilitated transport
- Eigencolloid
- Fiveling or decahedral nanoparticle
- Fullerene
- Gallium(II) selenide
- Icosahedral twins
- Indium(III) selenide
- Liposome
- Magnetic immunoassay
- Magnetoelastic filament a.k.a. magnetic nanochain
- Magnetic nanoparticles
- Nanobiotechnology
- Nanocrystalline silicon
- Nanofluid
- Nanogeoscience
- Nanomaterials
- Nanomedicine
- Nanoparticle deposition
- Nanoparticle tracking analysis
- Nanotechnology
- Patchy particles
- Photonic crystal
- Plasmon
- Platinum nanoparticle
- Quantum dot
- Self-assembly of nanoparticles
- Silicon quantum dot
- Silicon
- Silver Nano
- Sol–gel process
- Synthesis of nanoparticles by fungi
- Transparent material
- Upconverting nanoparticles
- Erythrocyte membrane-coated nanoparticles
