= Magnetic nanoring =

Magnetic nanorings are a form of magnetic nanoparticles, typically made of iron oxide in the shape of a ring. They have multiple applications in the medical field and computer engineering. In experimental trials, they provide a more localized form of cancer treatment by attacking individual cells instead of a general cancerous region of the body, as well as a clearer image of tumors by improving accuracy of cancer cell identification. They also allow for a more efficient and smaller, MRAM (memory storage unit in a computer), which helps reduce the size of the technology houses it. Magnetic nanorings can be produced in various compositions, shapes, and sizes by using hematite nanorings as the base structure.

== Applications ==
=== Cancer treatment ===
Magnetic nanorings have been experimentally proven to improve the accuracy of hyperthermia cancer treatment and cancer imaging.

==== Hyperthermia Cancer Treatment ====
Multiple studies have shown that magnetic nanorings improves magnetic hyperthermia cancer treatment by targeting cancer cells and limit the amount of environmental heating, thus creating a more tailored treatment.

Magnetic hyperthermia is an experimental subdivision of hyperthermia cancer treatment which utilizes cancer cells' vulnerability to high temperatures, typically 40-44 degrees Celsius, to initiate cell death. Magnetic hyperthermia utilizes heating properties of magnetic hysteresis by injecting magnetic nanoparticles to the cancerous area, then applies an alternating magnetic field to conduct heat. The use of magnetic nanoparticles is particularly useful because it can reach regions of the body that surface treatments (such as microwaves, ultrasounds, and radiation) cannot, and it can remain in the cancerous region for an extended period of time allowing for multiple treatment sessions per injection. In addition, there is easy control of the amount of heat based on size and shape of the magnetic nanoparticle, and it can temporarily bond with antibodies for effective targeting of the tumor. While there may be concern regarding acute toxicity from the use of foreign metals, the dose is well below the acute toxicity range, and studies have suggested it is safer than other methods because of its accuracy and effectiveness within a lower temperature range.

Studies have also shown that magnetic nanoring based hyperthermia treatment can be used in conjunction with immune blockade checkpoint techniques, which is a way to trigger the body's immune system to attack the cancerous region. Specifically, inducing the Fenton Reaction can more effectively kill cancer cells and prevent new ones from growing. The Fenton Reaction, a reaction involving iron ions, functions by transforming the acidic cancerous environment into an inhospitable basic environment for cancer cells. Consequently, iron-containing magnetic nanorings are particularly useful for cancer treatment.

Past methods of magnetic hyperthermia cancer treatment used Superparamagnetic Iron Oxide Nanoparticles (SPIONs) in the shape of a sphere which would nonspecifically heat the environment around the tumor killing healthy cells. In comparison, Vortex Iron oxide Particles (VIPs), a magnetic nanoring, allows for more controlled and precise intracellular hyperthermia. Intracellular hyperthermia occurs when the VIP enters the cell and heats up from the inside allowing for an even more specified form of hyperthermia. VIPs can also produce a magnetic vortex, which is when the magnetic moments (measure of intensity and direction of magnetism) of the VIPs occur in a curling-inward direction under an alternating magnetic field. The curling-inward direction of the magnetic moments causes heat production only within the vortex, allowing for a more efficient and less harmful form of treatment.

==== Cancer Imaging ====
Magnetic nanorings have shown to create clearer MRIs and photoacoustic images of tumors in experiments. This form of magnetic nanoring contains gold and is shaped like a wreath. Once again, the magnetic nanoring more effectively identifies cancer cells than previous methods because the wreath shape will disassemble in response to a magnetic field and high levels of glutathione, a chemical specifically found in cancer cells, which allows for higher-contrast imaging.

=== MRAM ===
Magnetic nanorings are used in MRAM (magnetic random access memory) because of its capabilities to rapidly switch currents. Magnetic nanorings replaced GMR (giant magnetoresistance) particles in the CIMS (current induced magnetization switching) of MRAM because the long ovular or rectangular shape of GMR would cause interference with neighboring GMR. This interference would create magnetic noise, thus decreasing the effectiveness of MRAM. In comparison, the symmetrical structure of magnetic nanorings reduces the interactions with neighboring nanorings, thus creating a more consistent and reliable MRAM. The smaller size of the nanorings also allows for decreased power consumption and the creation of a more compact MRAM, ultimately decreasing the size of electronics.

== Synthesis ==
Magnetic nanorings are created through hydrothermal synthesis (a synthesis reaction that occurs at high temperatures) with microwaves to facilitate a faster reaction rate.

=== $\ce{\alpha-Fe2O3}$ (Hematite) ===
Almost all forms of magnetic nanorings are formed by modifying hematite($\ce{\alpha-Fe2O3}$), which is created by combining aqueous iron(III)chloride and aqueous ammonium dihydrogen phosphate at 220 degree Celsius. Altering the amount of reactants controls the shape and size of the produced hematite.

$\ce{FeCl3(aq) + NH4H2PO4(aq) -> \alpha-Fe2O3(s)}$

=== $\ce{Fe3O4}$ and $\ce{\gamma-Fe3O4}$ ===
$\ce{Fe3O4}$ is produced by combining hematite with hydrogen gas at 420 degrees Celsius for 120 minutes.

$\ce{\alpha-Fe2O3(s) + H2(g) -> Fe3O4(s)}$

$\ce{\gamma-Fe3O4}$ is produced by cooling $\ce{Fe3O4}$ to 210 degrees Celsius with air for 120 minutes.

$\ce{Fe3O4(s) + air -> \gamma-Fe3O4(s)}$

=== $\ce{MFe2O4}$ ===
M is a metal with a 2+ charge, such as Co, Mn, Ni, and Cu. $\ce{MFe2O4}$ is produced by mixing $\ce{\alpha-Fe2O3}$ with an aqueous solution with metal ions and hydroxide ions at 60 degrees Celsius, then a metal hydroxide( $\ce{M(OH)2}$) coating forms on top of the hematite. The hematite with a metal hydroxide coating is then heated at 300 degrees Celsius for 30 minutes with hydrogen gas, and then heated again at 720 degrees Celsius for 3 hours with air to form $\ce{MFe2O4}$.

$\ce{\alpha-Fe2O3(s) + M(OH)2(aq) -> \alpha-Fe2O3(s) + M(OH)2 (s)}$

$\ce{\alpha-Fe2O3(s) + M(OH)2(s) -> MFe2O4 (s)}$

== See also ==
- Magnetic nanoparticles
- Hyperthermia therapy
- Magnetic hysteresis
