= Tronado machine =

Experimental device once thought to have treated cancer

The Tronado Machine was a device which employed ultra high frequency or microwave radiation as a hyperthermia therapy for cancer; however, tests have failed to back its treatment claims. Wolfgang Guettner began designing the machine in the 1960s.

The treatment was improved and a new type of machine built by Dr John Holt who was formerly Head of Oncology at Sir Charles Gairdner Hospital, Perth, Western Australia. He later established an independent clinic in West Perth. After Holt's retirement the clinic moved to Claremont where a research institute was established alongside the clinic. A further treating facility was established by Dr Hugh Tinsley in Dublin, Ireland. This clinic and the treatment were assessed by the Irish government and the clinic received government grants to assist with the ongoing costs of establishment.

== Lack of scientific validation ==
Tests conducted on behalf of the National Health and Medical Research Council of Australia have concluded that UHF Radiowave therapy produces no therapeutic benefit when used in conjunction with conventional cancer treatment. The report "Review of the use of microwave therapy for the treatment of patients with cancer" conducted a review of the literature as well as an audit of Dr. Holt's patient records between 1973 and 2003. Regarding the literature review, the report stated "There is currently no published scientific evidence that shows benefit of UHF cancer therapy alone or when combined with ‘glucose-blocking agents’ (GBA) as treatment for patients with cancer."

Regarding the audit of Dr. Holt's clinical data, the report says, in part, "Despite the small patient treatment groups, some trends were evident in this audit. Firstly, the complete remission rates were not high in any group. The study did not confirm Dr Holt’s previous reports of a 100% response rate for bladder tumours (Holt, 1988). The initial response rate (complete response and partial response) was 50% for RT alone, 34% for RT + UHF and 17% for UHF + GBA. Following salvage surgery, the overall response rate (complete response and partial response) was higher for patients treated with RT alone (44%) compared to RT+UHF (25%) or UHF + GBA (11%)."

== See also ==
- Rife machine
