= Erythrocyte membrane-coated nanoparticles =

Nanoparticles with red blood cell coating

Erythrocyte membrane-coated nanoparticles (EMCNPs) are nanoparticles encapsulated with membranes derived from red blood cells (RBCs) to enhance drug delivery. By mimicking RBCs, EMCNPs evade immune clearance, prolong circulation, and improve targeted delivery for applications like cancer therapy and infection management.

== Background ==
Erythrocyte membrane-coated nanoparticles combine synthetic nanoparticles with red blood cell membranes to create biomimetic drug delivery systems. Unlike conventional pharmaceutical drugs, which often lack specificity and bioavailability, EMCNPs offer targeted delivery and reduced toxicity. Mimicking the appearance of erythrocytes, EMCNPs can remain undetected by the immune system, meaning a lower therapeutic dosage may be needed to have the same effect. They exploit the enhanced permeability and retention effect, where nanoparticles accumulate in tumors due to leaky vasculature, improving therapeutic efficacy with lower doses.

Synthetic nanoparticles have many tunable properties, such as size, surface charge, and hydrophobicity, that can be tailored to specific applications like drug encapsulation or sustained release. Many nanoparticle materials, such as poly(d,l-lactide-co-glycolide), are biocompatible and biodegradable, making them suitable for in vivo use. Advances in polymer science and nanotechnology have enabled the development of hybrid systems combining synthetic and biological components.

EMCNPs, a type of cellular membrane-coated nanoparticle, use intact RBC membranes to coat nanoparticle cores. This approach integrates the tunability of synthetic nanoparticles with the immune-evasive properties of RBCs, mediated by proteins like CD47, which inhibits macrophage uptake.

== Preparation ==
EMCNPs are prepared using preformed nanoparticles, such as PLGA nanoparticles, coated with RBC membranes. RBCs are isolated from whole blood via hypotonic treatment, removing intracellular contents to create RBC ghosts. These ghosts are washed and extruded through porous membranes to form RBC membrane-derived vesicles. The vesicles are fused with nanoparticle cores through methods like co-extrusion, where the mixture is forced through a porous membrane, forming a single RBC membrane bilayer around the core.

=== Chemical mechanism of the erythrocyte coating ===
As part of the preparation process, red blood cells are coated with a dense polysaccharide membrane, termed the glycocalyx, which is important for its cell stability and immune system escape characteristics. The dense polysaccharide coating is the equivalent of a layer of hydrophilic coating, stabilizing the inner molecule. Polymeric nanoparticles can interact with the glycocalyx, stabilizing it through energy interactions and minimizing the likelihood of membrane disruption. Within the glycocalyx, there are negatively charged sialyl residues that play a key role in the interaction with NPs. Negatively charged NPs form nuclei shells with the polysaccharide membrane through electrostatic repulsion

=== Methods for coating nanoparticles ===
Several techniques are used to coat nanoparticles with erythrocyte membranes to create EM-coated nanoparticles, including co-extrusion, microfluidic electroporation, and cell membrane-templated polymerization.

==== Co-extrusion ====
This method uses mechanical force to fuse EM-derived vesicles with preformed NPs, such as PLGA or Fe_{3}O_{4} nanoparticles, by repeatedly passing the mixture through a porous membrane. The process results in a single EM bilayer around the NP core. Excess vesicles are removed via centrifugation, yielding EMCNPs. While simple and widely used, co-extrusion may damage membrane proteins due to shear stress, potentially reducing immune evasion, and can result in lower colloidal stability compared to other methods.

==== Microfluidic electroporation ====
This technique employs a microfluidic device to mix EM vesicles and NPs, applying controlled electrical pulses to create transient pores in the vesicles, allowing NP entry and membrane fusion. It preserves membrane integrity better than co-extrusion, minimizing protein loss, and produces EMCNPs with enhanced colloidal stability and improved in vivo performance, such as in magnetic resonance imaging and photothermal therapy.

==== Cell Membrane-Templated polymerization ====
This method involves in situ polymerization of monomers within EM vesicles to form nanogel cores, using UV irradiation and a membrane-impermeable inhibitor to prevent extracellular polymerization. It ensures complete membrane coating and allows precise control over NP size and stiffness, overcoming compatibility issues with preformed cores.

== Clinical applications ==
Erythrocyte membrane-coated nanoparticles have shown efficacy in preclinical studies, with some red blood cell-based systems already in clinical trials. In cancer therapy, EMCNPs prolong drug circulation, reduce immune clearance, and enhance tumor targeting via the EPR effect. For example, Hu et al. developed EMCNPs loaded with doxorubicin, demonstrating tumor growth inhibition and improved immune compatibility in mice.

EMCNPs with Iron Oxide nanoparticles support magnetic-guided therapy, reducing immune incompatibility and increasing circulation time. In preclinical models, EMCNPs loaded with fluorophores exhibited longer circulation than PEG-coated controls Clinical trials of RBC-based systems, like EryDex (NCT01255358) for ataxia-telangiectasia and GR-ASPA (NCT01518517, NCT01810705) for leukemia, highlight the potential for EMCNPs to advance targeted therapies.

== Challenges ==
Erythrocyte membrane-coated nanoparticles face several barriers to clinical translation, including manufacturing scalability, regulatory approval, and quality control. Co-extrusion, microfluidic electroporation, and cell membrane-templated polymerization are labor-intensive and costly processes, limiting large-scale production. For example, co-extrusion's mechanical process is difficult to standardize, reducing reliability and sterility. Synthetic membranes may address scalability but require further development

Regulatory challenges, overseen by the U.S. Food and Drug Administration and European Medicines Agency, involve extensive safety and efficacy evaluations. The hybrid nature of EMCNPs complicates assessments, necessitating standardized guidelines. Variability in RBC membrane sources and preparation methods affects consistency, and current analytical tools may lack sensitivity for batch differences. Ensuring membrane stability during storage is also critical.

== Advantages of EMCNPs ==
EMCNPs offer many advantages over native nanoparticles. Since native red blood cells circulate for approximately 120 days in the human body, RBCs have been studied as carriers for a wide range of materials including enzymes, drugs, proteins, and macromolecules. RBCs become spherical due to differences in osmotic pressure, enabling them to easily package a payload. In Xia et al.'s review, they highlight six key benefits of using RBCs as carriers for NPs:

1. Immune evasion and prolonged circulation via CD47
2. Biocompatibility and biodegradability
3. Reduced nanoparticle toxicity
4. Long lifespan ( 120 days)
5. High drug-loading capacity due to abundant membrane material
6. Enhanced stability, preventing aggregation and extending storage

EMCNPs improve tumor targeting via increased circulation, immune evasion, and reduced toxicity, resulting in increasing drug concentration at target sites.

== Mechanisms of action ==
Erythrocyte Membrane Coated Nanoparticles achieve prolonged circulation and immune evasion through interactions mediated by the RBC membrane. The membrane's glycocalyx, a polysaccharide layer, stabilizes the nanoparticle and reduces immune recognition. Negatively charged sialyl residues in the glycocalyx facilitate electrostatic repulsion with negatively charged nanoparticles, enhancing stability

The CD47 protein, a "self" marker on RBC membranes, binds to signal-regulatory protein alpha on macrophages, inhibiting phagocytosis. Studies, such as by Hu et al., show EMCNPs have a longer half-life than polyethylene glycol-coated nanoparticles due to reduced clearance by the reticuloendothelial system. Polyacrylamide gel electrophoresis analysis confirmed that immunosuppressive proteins, including CD47, are transferred during membrane coating, maintaining functionality. Using autologous RBCs further minimizes immune responses.

== Types of nanoparticles ==
Erythrocyte membrane-coated nanoparticles utilize various materials as nanoparticle cores, each selected for properties like biodegradability, drug release profiles, and therapeutic functionality.

=== Polymeric nanoparticles ===
==== Poly(caprolactone) nanoparticles ====
Poly(caprolactone), a biodegradable polyester with a low glass transition temperature, forms nanoparticle cores. Erythrocyte membrane coated PCL NPs loaded with paclitaxel extend blood circulation half-life by 5.8-fold and inhibit over 90% of tumor growth in metastatic breast cancer models when combined with tumor-penetrating peptides like iRGD. Surface modifications or near-infrared -responsive design modifications to PCL NPs address challenges like limited tumor targeting

==== Polypyrrole nanoparticles ====
Polypyrrole nanoparticles exhibit photothermal and photoacoustic properties, suitable for photothermal therapy and photoacoustic imaging . EM-coated PPy NPs, combined with endothelin A receptor antagonists, enhance tumor blood perfusion and reduce tumor weight in cancer models.

==== Poly(lactide acid) nanoparticles ====
Poly(lactide acid), a biocompatible and biodegradable polymer, is used in EMCNPs for controlled drug release. PLA nanoparticles loaded with doxorubicin release 5% of the drug within 2 hours when chemically conjugated, compared to 20% for physically encapsulated Dox, with EM coating enabling sustained release over approximately 72 hours. This property is beneficial for applications in leukemia treatment

==== Poly(d,l-lactide-co-glycolide) nanoparticles ====
Poly(d,l-lactide-co-glycolide), an FDA-approved polyester, offers tunable biodegradability and biocompatibility, prepared via methods like emulsification and nanoprecipitation. EM-coated PLGA NPs loaded with perfluorocarbons prolong blood circulation and deliver oxygen to hypoxic tumors, enhancing radiotherapy outcomes.

==== Gelatin nanoparticles ====
Broad spectrum bacteria secrete gelatinase, which breaks down gelatin. Thus, gelatin nanoparticles offer a targeted strategy to control antibiotic release at infection sites. EM-coated gelatin NPs loaded with vancomycin evade immune clearance and treat bacterial infections, providing a bioresponsive delivery system for various pathogens.

=== Non-Polymeric nanoparticles ===
==== Iron Oxide nanoparticles ====
Iron Oxide nanoparticles, characterized by magnetism, biocompatibility, and low toxicity, are applied in magnetic resonance imaging, drug delivery, and hyperthermia. EM-coated Fe_{3}O_{4} NPs reduce immune clearance, retaining 14.2% of the injected dose in blood after 24 hours compared to less than 6% for PEGylated NPs, and minimize reticuloendothelial system uptake, supporting prolonged circulation.

==== Magnetic nanoclusters ====
MNCs, clusters of crystallized iron oxide, exhibit enhanced photothermal effects compared to individual Fe_{3}O_{4} nanoparticles. EM-coated MNCs reduce macrophage uptake by 2.34-fold and achieve tumor accumulation of 4.937% ID/g at 1 hour post-injection. In PTT, they generate tumor temperatures above 50 °C, achieving tumor inhibition rates of 93.81%, indicating potential for breast cancer treatment.

==== Mesoporous Silica nanoparticles ====
MSNs, with large surface areas and adjustable pore sizes, support high-capacity drug loading. EM-coated MSNs loaded with doxorubicin and chlorin e6 combine chemotherapy and photodynamic therapy, with laser stimulation increasing Dox uptake by 1.9- to 2.0-fold at 1, 2, and 4 hours of incubation, demonstrating efficacy in breast cancer models.

==== Upconversion nanoparticles ====
UCNPs offer low toxicity, photostability, and optical properties for PDT [21]. EM-coated UCNPs modified with folic acid and triphenylphosphonium enable dual targeting of cancer cells and mitochondria, producing over 4-fold higher singlet oxygen levels and reducing tumor volume to one-tenth of controls after 20 days of PDT.

==== Gold nanoparticles ====
AuNPs, including gold nanocages, are biocompatible and effective for PTT due to their light-to-heat conversion. EM-coated AuNCs increase tumor deposition by twofold and achieve 100% survival in tumor-bearing mice over 45 days, attributed to prolonged circulation and enhanced tumor targeting

== Future directions and research ==
Erythrocyte blood cell membrane-coated nanoparticles have shown efficacy in preclinical and early clinical studies with red blood cell -based systems like EryDex (NCT01255358) and GR-ASPA (NCT01518517, NCT01810705) in clinical trials for ataxia-telangiectasia and acute lymphoblastic leukemia.

=== Sourcing RBCs for clinical use ===
The source of red blood cells is a critical challenge in implementing EMCNPs in the clinic. Laboratory studies often use blood from mice, bovines, or human donors, but clinical applications favor autologous RBCs to maximize compatibility and support personalized therapy. Using stored blood from blood banks is an alternative, but mechanical and biochemical changes, such as reduced CD47 protein levels, may compromise immune evasion.

=== Scalability and reproducibility ===
Batch-to-batch consistency requires standardized protocols for membrane isolation and fusion.

=== Storage and stability ===
Ensuring the long-term stability of EMCNPs post-fabrication is essential for practical use.

=== Sterilization and safety ===
Sterilization techniques must remove contaminants, pyrogens, viruses, and denatured membrane proteins from EMCNPs without compromising safety or efficacy.

=== Regulatory and economic considerations ===
EMCNPs, as nanomedicines combining biological and synthetic components, face complex regulatory challenges from the FDA and EMA.

=== Enhancing clinical translation ===
While RBC-based systems have reached clinical stages, EMCNPs require further validation. Future studies may evaluate biodistribution and clearance in larger animal models and use patient-derived xenografts to better mimic human disease, improving translatability. Research into immunocompatibility is essential to minimize cross-reactivity, particularly for constructs derived from donor blood, requiring robust donor screening to ensure hemocompatibility.

=== Expanding therapeutic and diagnostic applications ===
EMCNPs could support applications beyond cancer and infection management with immunotherapy, gene therapy, or diagnostic imaging with technetium-99m .
