= Colloid-facilitated transport =

Colloid-facilitated transport designates a transport process by which colloidal particles serve as transport vector of diverse contaminants in the surface water (sea water, lakes, rivers, fresh water bodies) and in underground water circulating in fissured rocks (limestone, sandstone, granite, ...). The transport of colloidal particles in surface soils and in the ground can also occur, depending on the soil structure, soil compaction, and the particles size, but the importance of colloidal transport was only given sufficient attention during the 1980 years. Radionuclides, heavy metals, and organic pollutants, easily sorb onto colloids suspended in water and that can easily act as contaminant carrier.

Various types of colloids are recognised: inorganic colloids (clay particles, silicates, iron oxy-hydroxides, ...), organic colloids (humic and fulvic substances). When heavy metals or radionuclides form their own pure colloids, the term "Eigencolloid" is used to designate pure phases, e.g., Tc(OH)_{4}, Th(OH)_{4}, U(OH)_{4}, Am(OH)_{3}. Colloids have been suspected for the long range transport of plutonium on the Nevada Nuclear Test Site. They have been the subject of detailed studies for many years. However, the mobility of inorganic colloids is very low in compacted bentonites and in deep clay formations because of the process of ultrafiltration occurring in dense clay membrane. The question is less clear for small organic colloids often mixed in porewater with truly dissolved organic molecules.

== See also ==
- Colloid
- Dispersion
- DLVO theory (from Derjaguin, Landau, Verwey and Overbeek)
- Double layer (electrode)
- Double layer (interfacial)
- Double layer forces
- Gouy-Chapman model
- Eigencolloid
- Electrical double layer (EDL)
- Flocculation
- Hydrosol
- Interface
- Interface and colloid science
- Nanoparticle
- Peptization (the inverse of flocculation)
- Sol (colloid)
- Sol-gel
- Streaming potential
- Suspension
- Zeta potential
