= Magnetoelastic filament =

Magnetoelastic filaments are one-dimensional composite structures that exhibit both magnetic and elastic properties. Interest in these materials tends to focus on the ability to precisely control mechanical events using an external magnetic field. Like piezoelectricity materials, they can be used as actuators, but do not need to be physically connected to a power source. The conformations adopted by magnetoelastic filaments are dictated by the competition between its elastic and magnetic properties.

== Mechanical Behavior ==
=== Magnetic nanochains ===
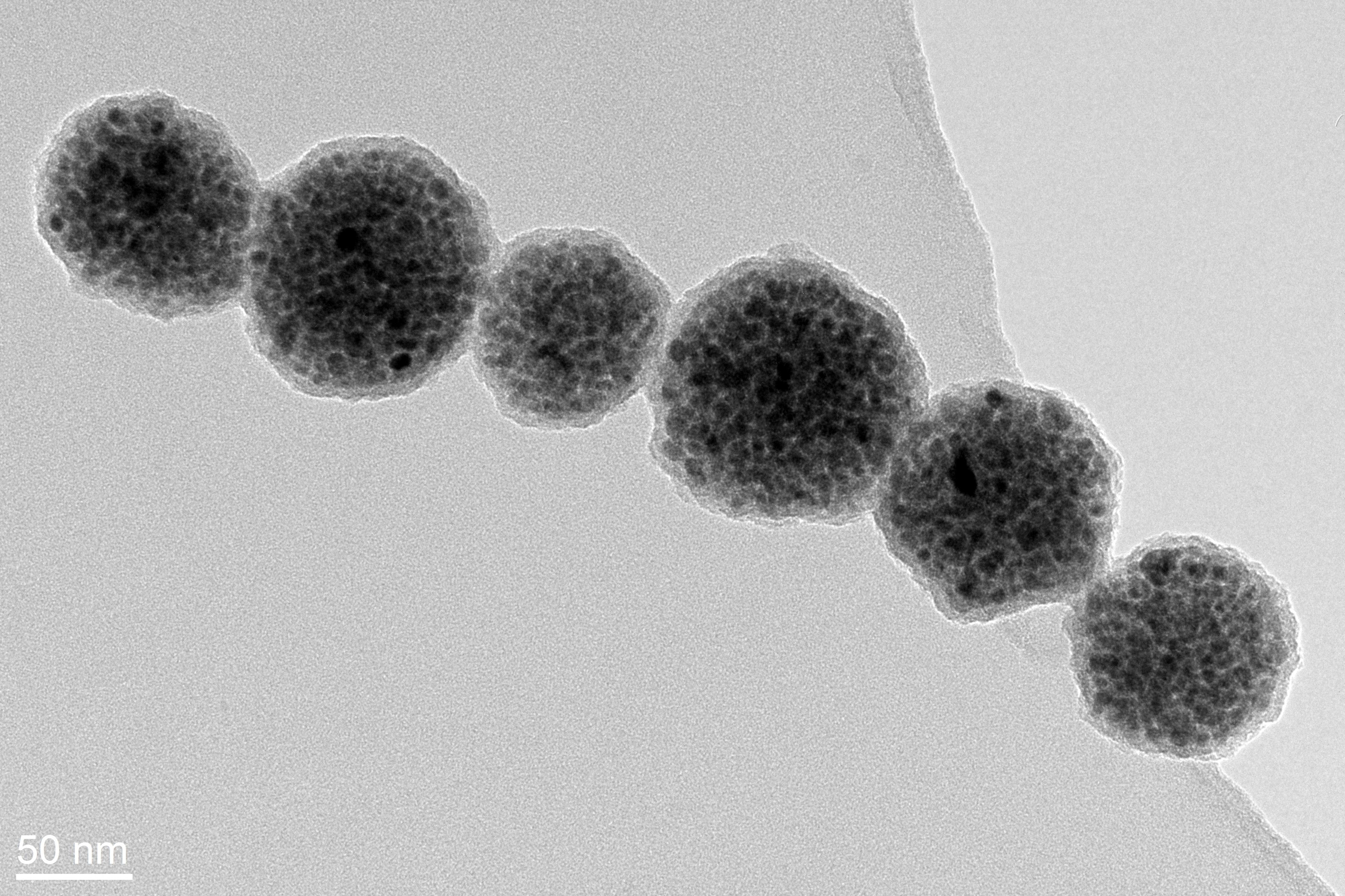
TEM image of well-defined magnetic nanochain composed of six magnetic nanobeads.

Magnetic nanochains are a new class of magnetoresponsive and superparamagnetic nanostructures with highly anisotropic shapes which can be manipulated using magnetic field and magnetic field gradient. Such nanochains consist of self-assembled nanoparticle clusters which are magnetically assembled and fixated into a chain. Among the various linking methods used are silica coating, polyacrylic acid (PAA) coating, tetraethoxysilane condensation, biotinylation or glucose decomposition. Typically, the primary building blocks of these nanostructures are individual superparamagnetic iron oxide nanoparticles (SPIONs). Nanoparticle clusters which are composed of a number of individual magnetic nanoparticles (ca. 100 SPIONs) are known as magnetic nanobeads with a diameter of 50–200 nanometers.

The force exerted on a particle depends on the strength, direction, and dynamics of the applied magnetic field as well as the position and orientation of local magnetic dipoles. Dynamic magnetic fields allow for the greatest range of control over chain shape. Of principal interest is the force exerted on the ends of the chain as a result of a dynamic field. The effect of Larmor precession with a row of magnetic colloids results in dynamic interactions dependent on the field precession angle. In fact, sweeping through the magic angle flips sign of the dipole-dipole interaction. In a field precessing quickly around the z-axis, the force exerted on the end of the chain is given by

$$F_{end} \ {{=}} \ \frac{3\mu^2}{\sigma^4} \sin(2(\omega -\frac{d\psi}{dt})t)\mathbf{N} - \gamma \frac{d\psi}{dt}\mathbf{N}$$

where $\mu$ is the dipole moment, $\sigma$ is the bead diameter, $\omega$ is the angular frequency of the field precession, $\frac{d\psi}{dt}$ is the rate of change of the filament path, $\gamma$ is the viscous drag coefficient and $\mathbf{N}$ is the unit vector of the plane perpendicular to the tangent of the filament curve. This produces a periodic magnetic force. However, under fast precession, the second term remains non-zero and scales with $\omega^{-1}$. At low $\omega$, the magnetic torque dominates and the chain winds around itself. With a high $\omega$, the bending modulus dominates the energetic landscape and filaments form branched gels with a field-dependent bulk modulus.

The applied load on a filament is generally limited by the polymer linking method. The elastic strain regime for a simple covalently linked filament is short and are taken as inextensible under most conditions. If tensile forces become too large, plastic deformation can occur usually resulting in bond breaking and polymer disentanglement. These irreversible changes can result in the permanent change in the bending modulus which ultimately effects the filament performance.

=== Alloy Nanopillars ===
Using etching techniques such as focused ion beam milling, micro- or nano-sized pillars can be formed in magnetic materials. However, repeated bending of crystal pillars can cause defect formation and fatigue damage. This damage comes from the nucleation of cracks on the pillars surface, even in the elastic regime, due to localized plasticity. Crack propagation during successive compression and tension cycles can lead to pillar fracture. This is similar to what can be seen in cantilever magnetometry when operating under strong fields. Because of this, it is desirable to link smaller magnetic particles together with tougher, elastic materials, such as a polymer, rather than use a continuous alloy filament.

== Applications ==
The fabrication of magnetic nanochains with controlled aspect ratio, a uniform size, and a well-defined shape is the focus of many world-leading research groups and high-tech companies. The magnetic nanochains possess attractive properties which are significant added value for many potential uses including magneto-mechanical actuation-associated nanomedicines in low and super-low frequency alternating magnetic field. Such structures are used in a variety of applications, such as imaging and drug delivery. Other applications are shown below:

- Mechanical sensors for testing the elastic moduli of biomolecules and nanostructures.
- Microactuation
- MRI imaging
- Drug delivery
- Responsive coatings

== See also ==
- Superparamagnetism
- Magnetic shape-memory alloy
- Magnetostriction
