= Microwave thermotherapy =

Thermotherapy by microwaves for cancer

- Other names: Microwave therapy
- Specialty: Oncology

Microwave thermotherapy is a type of treatment in which body tissue is heated by microwave irradiation to damage and kill cancer cells or to make cancer cells more sensitive to the effects of radiation and certain anticancer drugs.

== See also ==
- Transurethral microwave thermotherapy
- Hyperthermia therapy
