= Hyperthermia therapy =

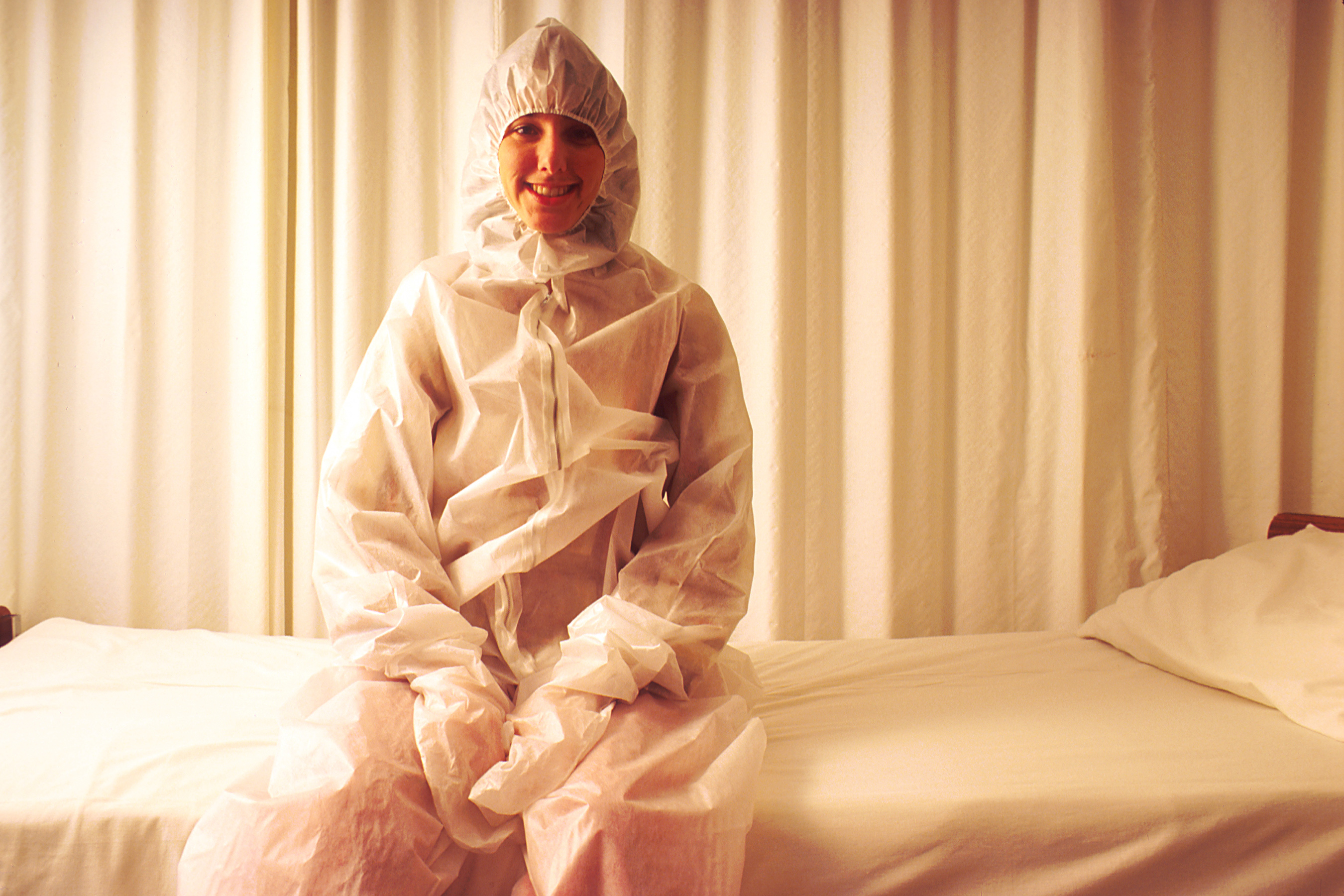
- Whole-body suit used in hyperthermia therapy
- ICD-10-PCS: 6A3
- ICD-9-CM: 93.35, 99.85
- MeSH: D006979
- OPS-301 code: 8–60

Hyperthermia therapy (or hyperthermia, or thermotherapy) is a type of medical treatment in which body tissue is exposed to temperatures above body temperature, in the region of 40–45 °C (104–113 °F). Hyperthermia is usually applied as an adjuvant to radiotherapy or chemotherapy, to which it works as a sensitizer, in an effort to treat cancer.

Hyperthermia uses higher temperatures than diathermy and lower temperatures than ablation. When combined with radiation therapy, it can be called thermoradiotherapy.

== Definition ==
Hyperthermia is defined as supra-normal body temperatures. There is no consensus as to what is the safest or most effective target temperature for the whole body. During treatment the body temperature reaches a level between 39.5 and 40.5 °C (103.1 and 104.9 °F). However, other researchers define hyperthermia between 41.8–42 °C (107.2–107.6 °F) (Europe, USA) to near 43–44 °C (109–111 °F) (Japan, Russia).

=== Types ===
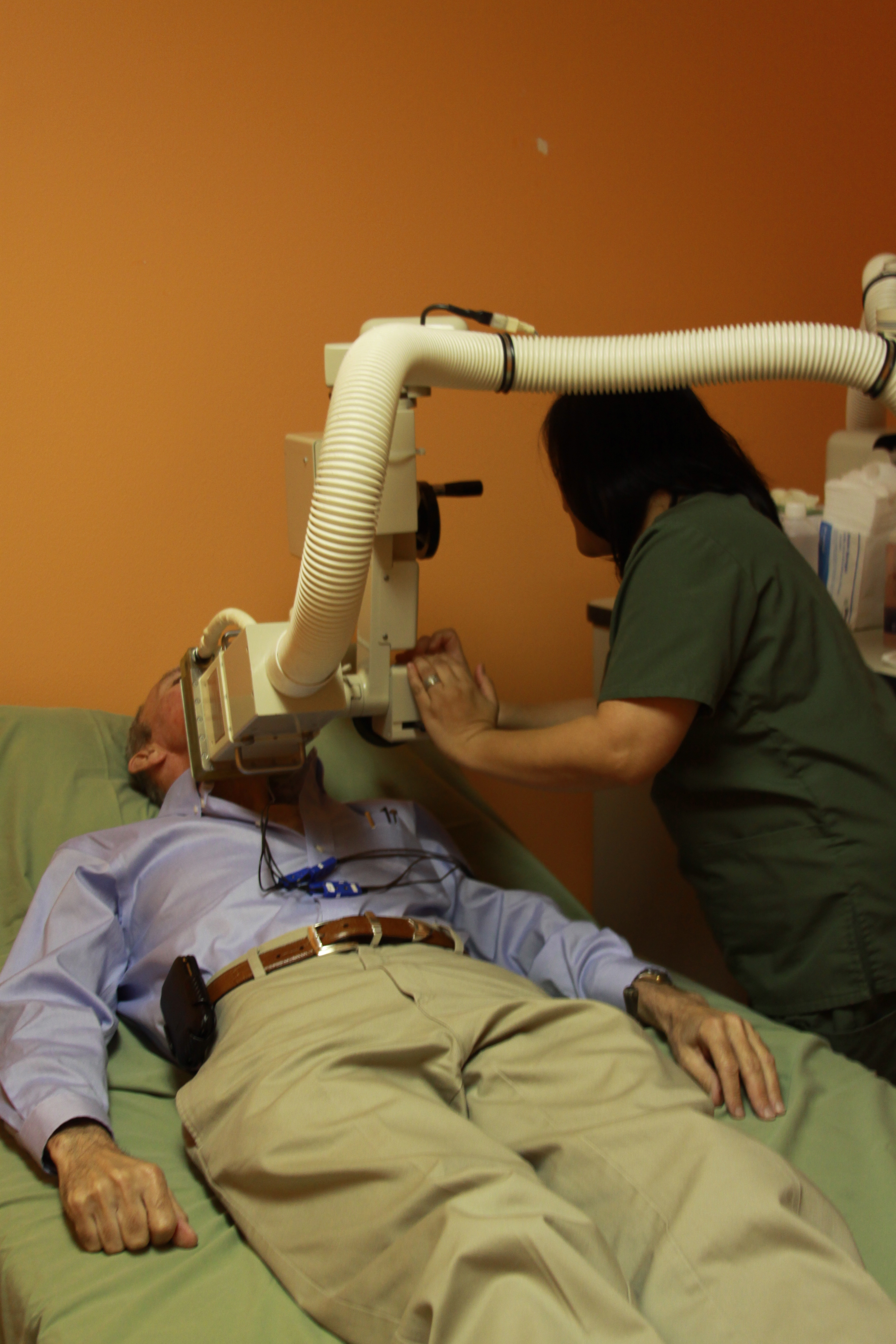
Patient is undergoing local hyperthermia treatment for head and neck cancer.

- Local hyperthermia heats a very small area and is typically used for cancers near or on the skin or near natural openings in the body (e.g., the mouth). In some instances, the goal is to kill the tumor by heating it, without damaging anything else. The heat may be created with microwave, radiofrequency, ultrasound energy or using magnetic hyperthermia (also known as magnetic fluid hyperthermia)). Depending on the location of the tumor, the heat may be applied to the surface of the body (superficial hyperthermia), inside normal body cavities (intraluminal hyperthermia), or deep in tissue through the use of needles or probes (interstitial hyperthermia). It should not be confused with ablation of small tumors, where higher temperatures (>55 °C) are applied with an aim to kill the tumor cells.
- Regional hyperthermia heats a larger part of the body, such as an entire organ or limb. Usually, the goal is to weaken cancer cells so that they are more likely to be killed by radiation and chemotherapeutic medications. This may use the same techniques as local hyperthermia treatment, or it may rely on blood perfusion. In blood perfusion, the patient's blood is removed from the body, heated up, and returned to blood vessels that lead directly through the desired body part. Normally, chemotherapy drugs are infused at the same time. One specialized type of this approach is continuous hyperthermic peritoneal perfusion (CHPP), which is used to treat difficult cancers within the peritoneal cavity (the abdomen), including primary peritoneal mesothelioma and stomach cancer. Hot chemotherapy drugs are pumped directly into the peritoneal cavity to kill the cancer cells.
- Whole-body hyperthermia heats the entire body to temperatures of about 39 to 43 °C (102 to 109 °F), with some advocating even higher temperatures. It is typically used to treat metastatic cancer (cancer that spread to many parts of the body). Techniques include infrared hyperthermia domes which include the whole body or the body apart from the head, putting the patient in a very hot room/chamber, or wrapping the patient in hot, wet blankets or a water tubing suit.

== Treatment ==
Research has shown that hyperthermia, when administered with other treatments, can shrink tumours and may assist other treatments kill cancer cells.

Localized hyperthermia treatment is a well-established cancer treatment method with a simple basic principle: If a temperature elevation to 40 °C (104 °F) can be maintained for one hour within a cancer tumor, the cancer cells will be destroyed.

The schedule for treatments has varied between study centers. After being heated, cells develop resistance to heat, which persists for about three days and reduces the likelihood that they will die from direct effects of the heat. Some even suggest maximum treatment schedule of twice a week. Japanese researchers treated people with "cycles" up to four times a week apart. Radiosensitivity may be achieved with hyperthermia, and using heat with every radiation treatment may drive the treatment schedule. Moderate hyperthermia treatments usually maintain the temperature for approximately an hour.

Before the advent of modern antiretroviral therapy extracorporeal whole body hyperthermia was tried as a treatment for HIV/AIDS, with some positive outcomes.

== Adverse effects ==
External application of heat may cause surface burns. Tissue damage to a target organ with a regional treatment will vary with what tissue is heated (e.g. brain treated directly may injure the brain, lung tissue treated directly may cause pulmonary problems). Whole body hyperthermia can cause swelling, blood clots, and bleeding. Systemic shock, may result, but is highly dependent upon method difference in achieving it. It may also cause cardiovascular toxicity. All techniques are often combined with radiation or chemotherapy, muddying how much toxicity is the result of those treatments versus the temperature elevation achieved.

== Technique ==
=== Heat sources ===
There are many techniques by which heat may be delivered. Some of the most common involve the use of focused ultrasound (FUS or HIFU), RF sources, infrared sauna, microwave heating, induction heating, magnetic hyperthermia, infusion of warmed liquids, or direct application of heat such as through sitting in a hot room or wrapping a patient in hot blankets.

=== Controlling temperature ===
One of the challenges in thermal therapy is delivering the appropriate amount of heat to the correct part of the patient's body. For this technique to be effective, the temperatures must be high enough, and the temperatures must be sustained long enough, to damage or kill the cancer cells. However, if the temperatures are too high, or if they are kept elevated for too long, then serious side effects, including death, can result. The smaller the place that is heated, and the shorter the treatment time, the lower the side effects. Conversely, tumor treated too slowly or at too low a temperature will not achieve therapeutic goals. The human body is a collection of tissues with differing heat capacities, all connected by a dynamic circulatory system with variable relationship to skin or lung surfaces designed to shed heat energy. All methods of inducing higher temperature in the body are countered by the thermo-regulatory mechanisms of the body. The body as a whole relies mostly on simple radiation of energy to the surrounding air from the skin (50% of heat lost this way) which is augmented by convection (blood shunting) and vaporization through sweat and respiration. Regional methods of heating may be more or less difficult based on the anatomic relationships, and tissue components of the particular body part being treated. Measuring temperatures in various parts of the body may be very difficult, and temperatures may locally vary even within a region of the body.

To minimize damage to healthy tissue and other adverse effects, attempts are made to monitor temperatures. The goal is to keep local temperatures in tumor bearing tissue under 44 °C (111 °F) to avoid damage to surrounding tissues. These temperatures have been derived from cell culture and animal studies. The body keeps itself normal human body temperature, near 37.6 °C (99.7 °F). Unless a needle probe can be placed with accuracy in every tumor site amenable to measurement, there is an inherent technical difficulty in how to actually reach whatever a treating center defines as an "adequate" thermal dose. Since there is also no consensus as to what parts of the body need to be monitored (common clinically measured sites are ear drums, oral, skin, rectal, bladder, esophagus, blood probes, or even tissue needles). Clinicians have advocated various combinations for these measurements. These issues complicate the ability of comparing different studies and coming up with a definition of exactly what a thermal dose actually should be for tumor, and what dose is toxic to what tissues in human beings. Clinicians may be able to apply advanced imaging techniques, instead of probes, to monitor heat treatments in real time; heat-induced changes in tissue are sometimes perceptible using these imaging instruments.

There is the further difficulty inherent in the devices delivering energy. Regional devices may not uniformly heat a target area, even without taking into account compensatory mechanisms of the body. A great deal of current research focuses on how one might precisely position heat-delivery devices (catheters, microwave and ultrasound applicators, etc.) using ultrasound or magnetic resonance imaging, as well as developing new types of nanoparticles that can more evenly distribute heat within a target tissue.

Among hyperthermia therapy methods, magnetic hyperthermia is well known as the one that produce a controllable heat inside the body. Because of using magnetic fluid in this method, temperature distribution can be controlled by the velocity, size of nanoparticles and distribution of them inside the body. These materials upon application of external, alternating magnetic field convert electromagnetic energy into thermal energy and induce temperature rises.

== Mechanism ==
Hyperthermia can kill cells directly, but its more important use is in combination with other treatments for cancer. Hyperthermia increases blood flow to the warmed area, perhaps doubling perfusion in tumors, while increasing perfusion in normal tissue by ten times or even more. This enhances the delivery of medications. Hyperthermia also increases oxygen delivery to the area, which may make radiation more likely to damage and kill cells, as well as preventing cells from repairing the damage induced during the radiation session.

Cancerous cells are not inherently more susceptible to the effects of heat. When compared in in vitro studies, normal cells and cancer cells show the same responses to heat. However, the vascular disorganization of a solid tumor results in an unfavorable microenvironment inside tumors. Consequently, the tumor cells are already stressed by low oxygen, higher than normal acid concentrations, and insufficient nutrients, and are thus significantly less able to tolerate the added stress of heat than a healthy cell in normal tissue.

Mild hyperthermia, which provides temperatures equal to that of a naturally high fever, may stimulate natural immunological attacks against the tumor. However, it is also induces a natural physiological response called thermotolerance, which tends to protect the treated tumor.

Moderate hyperthermia, which heats cells in the range of 40 to 42 °C (104 to 108 °F), damages cells directly, in addition to making the cells radiosensitive and increasing the pore size to improve delivery of large-molecule chemotherapeutic and immunotherapeutic agents (molecular weight greater than 1,000 daltons), such as monoclonal antibodies and liposome-encapsulated drugs. Cellular uptake of certain small molecule drugs is also increased.

Very high temperatures, above 50 °C (122 °F), are used for ablation (direct destruction) of some tumors. This generally involves inserting a metal tube directly into the tumor, and heating the tip until the tissue next to the tube has been killed.

== History ==
The application of heat to treat certain conditions, including possible tumors, has a long history. Ancient Greeks, Romans, and Egyptians used heat to treat breast masses; this is still a recommended self-care treatment for breast engorgement. Medical practitioners in ancient India used regional and whole-body hyperthermia as treatments.

During the 19th century, tumor shrinkage after a high fever due to infection had been reported in a small number of cases. Typically, the reports documented the rare regression of a soft tissue sarcoma after erysipelas (an acute streptococcus bacterial infection of the skin; a different presentation of an infection by "flesh-eating bacteria") was noted. Efforts to deliberately recreate this effect led to the development of Coley's toxin. A sustained high fever after induction of illness was considered critical to treatment success. This treatment is generally considered both less effective than modern treatments and, when it includes live bacteria, inappropriately dangerous.

Around the same period Westermark used localized hyperthermia to produce tumor regression in patients. Encouraging results were also reported by Warren when he treated patients with advanced cancer of various types with a combination of heat, induced with pyrogenic substance, and x-ray therapy. Out of 32 patients, 29 improved for 1 to 6 months.

Properly controlled clinical trials on deliberately induced hyperthermia began in the 1970s.

== Future directions ==
Hyperthermia may be combined with gene therapy, particularly using the heat shock protein 70 promoter.

Two major technological challenges make hyperthermia therapy complicated: the ability to achieve a uniform temperature in a tumor, and the ability to precisely monitor the temperatures of both the tumor and the surrounding tissue. Advances in devices to deliver uniform levels of the precise amount of heat desired, and devices to measure the total dose of heat received, are hoped for.

In locally advanced adenocarcinoma of middle and lower rectum, regional hyperthermia added to chemoradiotherapy achieved good results in terms of rate of sphincter sparing surgery.

=== Nanoparticle-mediated hyperthermia ===
A novel strategy to achieve local hyperthermia with minimal exposure to surrounding healthy tissue is to employ nanoparticles as heating agents. By transducing the energy from an external excitation source into heat, the nanoparticles function as local heating sources. Only the tissue in close proximity to the nanoparticles will experience an increase in temperature, thus reducing off-target toxicity. Nanoparticles can be up-concentrated in the tumor tissue by direct injection or by systemic administration followed by accumulation at the tumor site.

Examples of nanoparticle-mediated hyperthermia strategies include magnetic hyperthermia and photothermal therapy. In magnetic hyperthermia, magnetic nanoparticles function as the heat transductor under the influence of an alternating magnetic field.

Photothermal therapy utilises light-absorbing photothermal nanoparticles to convert light of a certain wavelength into heat, and is a convenient strategy for local heating of solid tumors that are easily accessible with a laser.

=== Magnetic hyperthermia ===
Magnetic hyperthermia is an experimental treatment for cancer, based on the fact that magnetic nanoparticles can transform electromagnetic energy from an external high-frequency field to heat. This is due to the magnetic hysteresis of the material when it is subjected to an alternating magnetic field. The area enclosed by the hysteresis loop represents losses, which are commonly dissipated as thermal energy. In many industrial applications this heat is undesirable, however it is the basis for magnetic hyperthermia treatment.

As a result, if magnetic nanoparticles are put inside a tumor and the whole patient is placed in an alternating magnetic field, the temperature of the tumor will rise. This elevation of temperature may enhance tumor oxygenation and radio- and chemosensitivity, hopefully shrinking tumors. This experimental cancer treatment has also been investigated for the aid of other ailments, such as bacterial infections.

Magnetic hyperthermia is defined by specific absorption rate (SAR) and it is usually expressed in watts per gram of nanoparticles.

== See also ==
- Microwave thermotherapy, use of microwave heating to treat cancer
- Photothermal Therapy, use of infrared radiation to treat cancer
- Thermotherapy, use of heat for treating other conditions
- Coley's toxins, a bacteria mixture used to generate fevers as an alternative cancer treatment
- Tronado machine, a device that uses microwave radiation to generate hyperthermia for cancer (no evidence of benefit)
- Pyrotherapy, a method of treating infections by raising the body temperature
