= Eigencolloid =

Eigencolloid is a term derived from the German language (eigen: own) and used to designate colloids made of pure phases, also known as intrinsic colloids.

Eigencolloids are metal oxyhydroxide colloids on the nanometer scale formed by aggregation of hydrolyzed metal ions. They are characterized by a very large specific surface area (up to 2000 m^{2}/g) and a high reactivity. They hold promise for the development of new industrial catalysts.

Many such colloids are formed by the hydrolysis of heavy metals cations or radionuclides, such as, for example, Tc(OH)_{4}, Th(OH)_{4}, U(OH)_{4}, Pu(OH)_{4}, or Am(OH)_{3}.

The term 'eigencolloid' or 'intrinsic colloid', is often used in distinction to a pseudocolloid. A pseudocolloid is one in which elements (colloids or cations) become adsorbed onto pre-existing groundwater colloids due to their affinity to these colloids or to the hydrophobic properties of the dispersing medium.

In environmental chemistry, enhanced migration of heavy metal and radioactive metal contaminants in ground and surface waters is often facilitated by eigencolloid formation.

== Actinide eigencolloids ==
Eigencolloid formation occurs readily in groundwater upon storage of radioactive waste. Colloid-facilitated transport is a mechanism responsible for the mobilisation of radionuclides into the wider environment, causing radioactive contamination. This is a public health concern since elevated radioactivity in the environment is mutagenic and can lead to cancer.

Eigencolloids have been implicated in the long-range transport of plutonium on the Nevada Test Site.

== See also ==
- Cations hydrolysis
- Colloid-facilitated transport
