= Gated drug delivery systems =

Method of controlled drug release

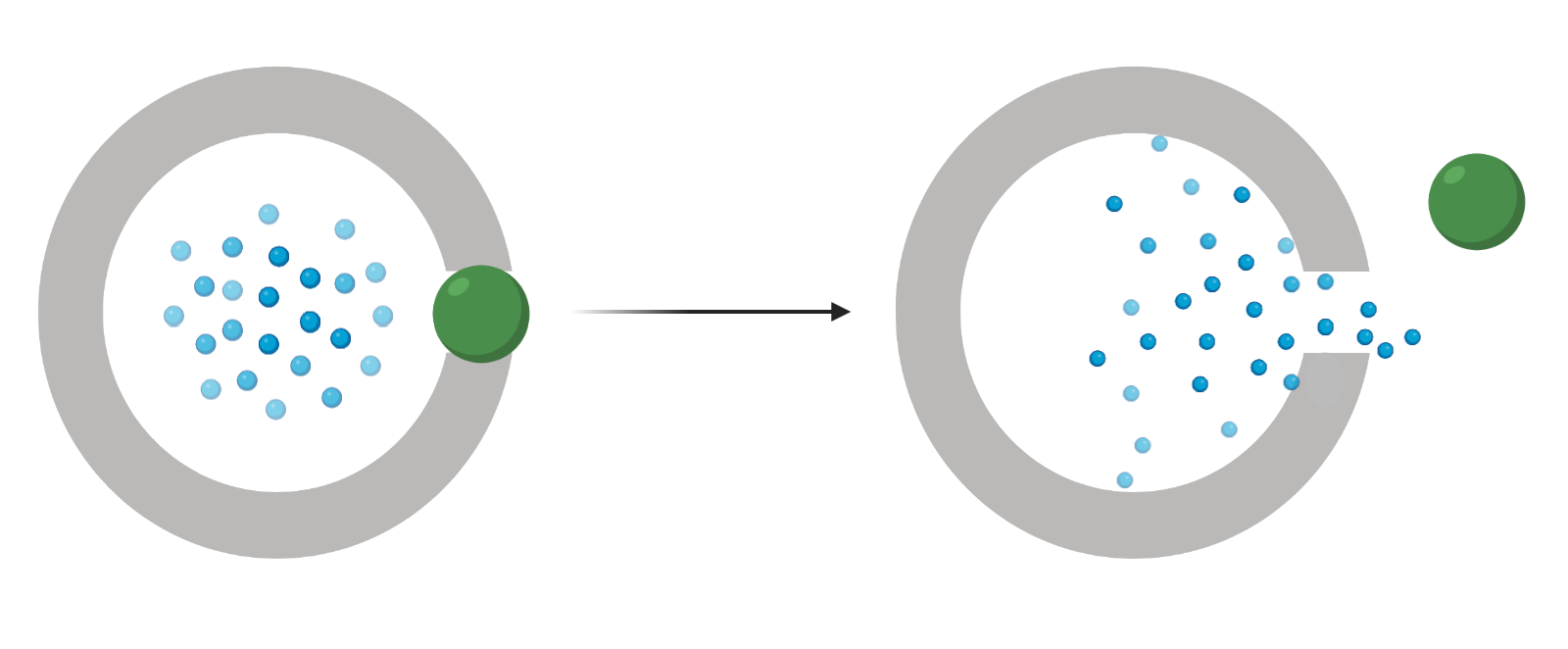
Illustration of a gated drug delivery platform. The cargo is retained in the scaffolding the by the gatekeeper. In the right conditions, the gatekeeper will detach from the scaffolding and the cargo can be released.

Gated drug delivery systems are a method of controlled drug release that center around the use of physical molecules that cover the pores of drug carriers until triggered for removal by an external stimulus. Gated drug delivery systems are a recent innovation in the field of drug delivery and pose as a promising candidate for future drug delivery systems that are effective at targeting certain sites without having leakages or off target effects in normal tissues. This new technology has the potential to be used in a variety of tissues over a wide range of disease states and has the added benefit of protecting healthy tissues and reducing systemic side effects.

== Uses ==
Gated drug delivery systems are an emerging concept that have drawn a lot of attention for their wide variety of potential applications in the medical field. The abnormal physiological conditions found within the tumor environment provide a breadth of options that could be used for externally stimulating these systems to release cargo. Gated systems in cancer therapy also have the added effect of reducing off target effects and decreasing leakage and delivery of drug to normal tissues. Another use for this technology could also be antibacterial regulation. These systems could be used to limit bacterial resistance as well as accumulation of antibiotics within the body. Antibacterial regulation potentially opens the door to using gated systems in theranostics, in which the system is able to detect an issue and then provide a therapeutic response.

There is also the potential for inhalable pulmonary drug delivery. With an increase in respiratory disease cases, the need for a drug delivery system that can be targeted to the lungs and provide sustained release is becoming more severe. This type of system would be applicable to patients experiencing asthma, pneumonia, obstructive pulmonary disease, and a number of other lung related diseases.

== History ==
The history of gated drug delivery systems starts in the mid-1960s when the concept of zero order controlled drug delivery was first thought of. Researchers raced to be able to find a drug delivery platform that would be able to have perfectly sustained drug release. These efforts were initially on the macroscopic level with some of the first controlled drug delivery (CDD) devices being an ophthalmic insert, an intrauterine device, and a skin patch. In the 1970s the drug delivery field shifted from macroscopic systems and started to delve into microscopic systems. Ideas such as steroid loaded poly (lactic-co-glycolic acid), PLGA, microparticles came into existence. The next major jump came in the 1980s in the form of nanotherapeutics. There were some major technological advances that allowed this next generation of drug delivery systems to come along. Those ideas were PEGylation, active targeting, and the enhanced permeation and retention effect (EPR).

Some of the issues that had been seen with earlier renditions of nanoparticle drug delivery was that there were off target effects from drug being delivered to normal tissue, the delivery system wasn't highly controllable, and there wasn't optimal accumulation of drug in the targeted area. This is when the development of "smart drug delivery" originated. Encapsulated within the idea of smart drug delivery is the use of gated delivery systems. Researchers discovered that certain materials could be loaded and capped to prevent premature drug release. The caps could subsequently be removed using different external stimuli. This created a class of drug delivery systems that were able to solve a number of problems exhibited by normal nanoparticle drug delivery systems. These smart drug delivery systems are able to deliver the drug with minimal leakage, can be actively or passively targeted to different areas within the body, and will only release drug in the presence of certain triggers, creating a sustained local response and accumulation of drug at the disease area.

== Scaffold fabrication ==
There are many different materials and fabrication methods that can be used to produce gated drug delivery scaffolding. In general, porous materials, such as mesoporous silica nanoparticles are used because of their expansive surface area, large loading capacity, and porous structures. These characteristics make it possible to load a variety of molecules that vary greatly in size.

=== Mesoporous silica nanoparticles ===
Mesoporous silica nanoparticles (MSN) are considered to be one of the most widely used systems for drug delivery. MSN's have some of the characteristic features of gated systems such as being porous and having a high loading capacity, but they also exhibit some special features such as increased biocompatibility and chemical inertness. These delivery systems are composed of two parts: the inorganic scaffold and the molecular gates. In a study conducted by the Kong Lab at Deakin University in Australia, the researchers generated MSN's by adding tetraethyl orthosilicate to aqueous cetyltrimethylammonium bromide. The MSN's they created had a surface area of 363 m^2/g, an average pore size of 2.59 nm, and a pore volume of 0.33 cm^3/g.

=== Mesoporous carbon Nanoparticles ===
Mesoporous carbon nanoparticles (MCN) are similar to MSN's. They have a similar structure and share key physical properties and characteristics. However, it has been found that MCN's can exhibit lower toxicity that MSN's. To date, not much research has been done on MCN's. The Du lab based in Nanjing, China took made MSN templates using the common method of combining CTAB and TEOS. The researchers then took the MSN templates and dispersed them in a glucose solution followed by autoclaving the mixture to produce a reaction. The product was then subjected to carbonization at 900 degrees Celsius and the MCN's were generated. The researchers found that MCN's had a surface area of 1575 m^2/g, a pore size of 2.2 nm, and an average diameter of 115 nm.

== External stimuli ==
There is a number of external triggers that can be used to release cargo on gated delivery systems. Examples of some triggers include pH, redox, enzyme, light, temperature, magnetic, ultrasound, and small molecule responsive gated systems.

=== pH ===
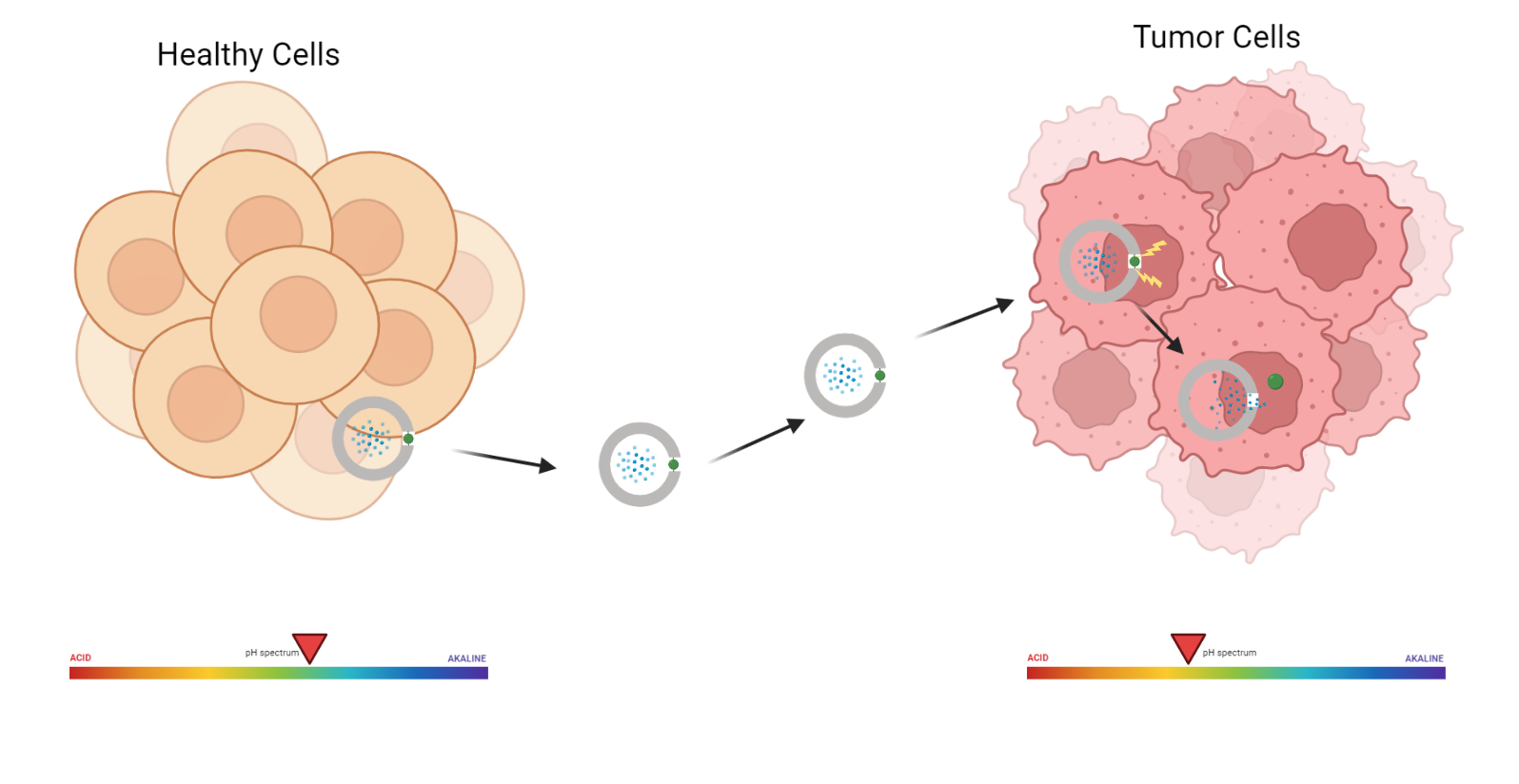
Illustration of a pH triggered gated delivery system. The cargo is retained within the scaffolding when the platform is in non-acidic conditions. When the platform reached the acidic tumor environment, the bonds between the scaffolding and the gatekeeper are hydrolyzed and the cargo is released.

One of the most common triggers for drug delivery systems is pH. This stimulus is abundantly used in cancer therapies due to the fact that the tumor microenvironment is acidic. The development of pH triggered systems meant that drug could be introduced to the body but not be deployed until encountering the tumor microenvironment. Hence a possible and probable reason that pH triggered systems are so common. There are a few approaches to making these systems. One method is using linkages that dissolve at certain pH levels. As the system enters an acidic environment, the linkages that hold that gates onto the porous scaffold are hydrolyzed and the cargo can be released. Examples of pH linkages are imine, amides, esters, and acetals. Another method that can be used is protonation. This method relies on electrostatic interactions between the gate molecule and the porous scaffold. The two will be linked together with a certain molecule, for example, acetylated carboxymethyl. When the system reaches an acidic environment, protonation of the molecule is initiated. The protonation causes a disruption in the linkage and the cargo can be released.

=== Redox ===
Redox reactions are also used for gated delivery systems. Within cells and the bloodstream there are several reducing agents that can be used to trigger drug release in gated systems. The most common reducing agent used in gated delivery system is glutathione (GSH) because it has been determined that GSH is the most abundant reducing agent in the body. GSH also has significantly different concentrations between the intracellular and extracellular environments making it easier to target either environment without getting triggered by the other. Furthermore, GSH is found in higher concentration within tumor cells. This provides another way to have sustained and local release of drug at tumor sites. There are generally 2 different mechanisms for this type of gated system. One method is to cleave disulfide bonds. Another method is to cleave bonds through the use of reactive oxygen species (ROS). Bonds that are able to be cleaved by ROS are generally thioketals, ketals, and diselenides.

=== Enzyme ===
Enzyme responsive gated materials are another class of gated delivery systems. In these scenarios, enzymes can trigger release of the gates from the scaffolds in drug delivery systems. The mechanism for this type of gate is that certain linkages are used that can be hydrolyzed by select enzymes. The two most popular choices are protease and hyaluronidase. An advantage of using enzyme responsive triggers is that there is a large amount of substrate specificity, and the enzymes are able to trigger their target with high selectivity, even under mild conditions. Another advantage of this system is that enzymes are found throughout the entire body and work on almost all biological processes so the delivery system could potentially be activated in any part of the body during many points within a singular process. One study done by the Martinez-Manez lab in Valencia, Spain aimed to generate MSNs linked to poly-l-glutamic acid (PGA) gates through peptide bonds. The trigger for this system was the presence of a lysosomal proteolytic enzyme (protease), in this case, pronase. The researchers found that in the absence of pronase, the system was only able to release less than 20% of its cargo in 24 hours, however, in the presence of pronase, there was a 90% release of cargo within 5 hours.

=== Magnetic and temperature ===
Within the topic of gated drug delivery systems, utilizing magnetic forces generally goes hand in hand with temperature stimulus. The phenomenon of magnetic hyperthermia is when superparamagnetic nanoparticles reorient themselves after being exposed to heat generated by an alternating magnetic field (AMF). This concept has been utilized within the drug delivery field wherein gatekeepers are magnetically linked to the scaffolding and upon the application of heat, reorient and allow for the release of drug. This particular method has not been researched as heavily given the drawback that high energy is needed to produce the AMF and uncap the system. However, the Vallet-Regi lab based in Madrid, Spain decided to investigate the possibility of using magnetic gates bound to the scaffold using DNA. The lab generated oligonucleotide-modified superparamagnetic mesoporous silica nanoparticles. They capped the scaffolding using iron oxide nanoparticles that carried complementary DNA to the scaffold's oligonucleotide sequence. What the lab found was that they were able to cap their system due to the DNA coming together and creating a double strand. Upon heating the system using an AMF, the DNA bonds detached, the system became uncapped, and the drug was able to be released. Furthermore, the lab found that this linkage was reversible. As temperature was reduced, the DNA was able to re-link to its complementary half. This study was able to illustrate the possibility of having a drug delivery system that could be remotely triggered and exhibit an on-off switch.

=== Electrostatic ===
Researchers started investigating electrostatic gating because some trigger drug delivery systems on the market are not entirely feasible. The main complaint of these other systems is that continual external stimulation is required for the therapy to function. In order to combat this complaint, the Grattoni lab in Houston, Texas started working on a drug delivery system that utilized electrostatic gating. The researchers generated a silicon carbide coated nanofluidic membrane that would have controlled release of a drug when a buried electrode was exposed to low intensity voltage. What the researchers found was that their device was able to successfully release drug and do it in such a way that drug release was proportional to the applied voltage. They also found that the device was chemically inert, making it feasible for long term implantation.
