= Biomagnetics =

Biomagnetics is a field of biotechnology. It has actively been researched since at least 2004. Although the majority of structures found in living organisms are diamagnetic, the magnetic field itself, as well as magnetic nanoparticles, microstructures and paramagnetic molecules can influence specific physiological functions of organisms under certain conditions. The effect of magnetic fields on biosystems is a topic of research that falls under the biomagnetic umbrella, as well as the construction of magnetic structures or systems that are either biocompatible, biodegradable or biomimetic. Magnetic nanoparticles and magnetic microparticles are known to interact with certain prokaryotes and certain eukaryotes.

Magnetic nanoparticles under the influence of magnetic and electromagnetic fields were shown to modulate redox reactions for the inhibition or the promotion of animal tumor growth. The mechanism underlying nanomagnetic modulation involves the convergence of magnetochemical and magneto-mechanical reactions.

== History ==
In 2014, biotechnicians at Monash University noticed that "the efficiency of delivery of DNA vaccines is often relatively low compared to protein vaccines" and on this basis suggested the use of superparamagnetic iron oxide nanoparticles (SPIONs) to deliver genetic materials via magnetofection because it increases the efficiency of drug delivery.

As of 2021, interactions have been studied between low cost iron oxide nanoparticles (IONPs) and the main groups of biomolecules: proteins, lipids, nucleic acids and carbohydrates. There have been suggestions of magnetically targeted drug delivery systems, in particular for the cationic peptide lasioglossin.

Around May 2021 rumours abounded that certain mRNA biotech delivery systems were magnetically active. Prompted by state-owned broadcaster France24, fr:Julien Bobroff who specialises in magnetism and teaches at the University of Paris-Saclay debunked the claims of COVID-19 conspiracy theorists as follows: "A vaccine against Covid-19... that would make magnets stick to the skin once injected is absolutely impossible from a scientific standpoint."
