= Electro-responsive drug delivery =

Drug delivery via electrical stimulus

Electro-responsive drug delivery is a class of smart drug delivery platforms that utilize externally applied electric fields or electrical stimulation to modulate the release of therapeutic agents. This method is a stimuli-responsive drug delivery system that allows for drug targeting at a specific site. By providing spatial and temporal control over the drug release, electro-responsive drug delivery has the potential for on-demand dosing and targeted therapy.

== Types ==
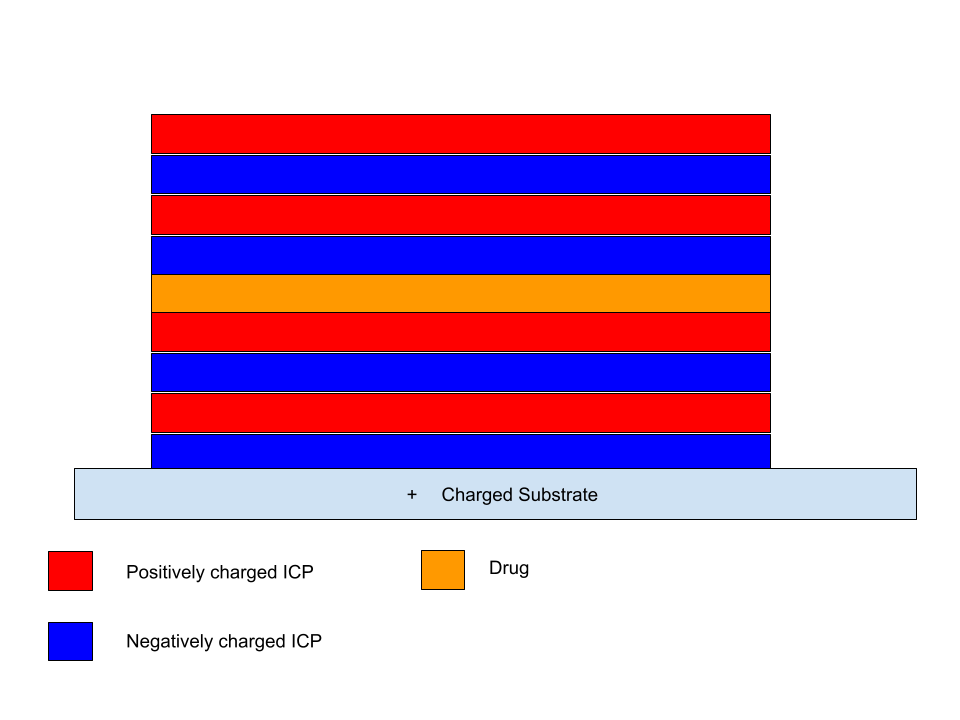
Figure 1: Illustration of an electro-responsive film using layer-by-layer technique. Alternating charges of ICPs are layered to allow for differing charges to attract to one another while enveloping the drug inside. Once an electrical field is applied onto the film, the structure destabilizes due to repelling charges which disassembles to release the drug.

=== Electro-responsive films ===
Electro-responsive drug delivery systems are usually composed of intrinsically conducting polymers (ICPs) which are polymers with electrical properties that can alter its structure in the presence of an electrical field. With its electrical properties, intrinsically conducting polymers can be formed into thin films by attracting them with electrodes. Many different nanostructures can be formed to create bulk reservoirs so that drugs can be stored within. An intrinsically conducting polymer known as polypyrroles can be shaped to have a wire-like structure when doped or contained with adenosine triphosphate (ATP) with almost all of the ATP being released when a negative voltage is used. ATP is typically used in many drug release experiments as ATP is a small negatively charged molecule that can be used as a model for charged drugs. intrinsically conducting polymers can also be prepared by layer-by-layer technique (LbL) which stacks ultrathin layers of alternating polymer charges to encapsulate a drug layer. When exposed to an electric potential, the entire stack disassembles due to electrostatic repulsion leading to release of the drug as seen in Figure 1. With the development of colloidal lithography, nanoparticles can be used as a template to create molds attached to an electrode. The technique immerses the electrode-nanoparticle mold into a solution containing monomer and drug which is then bonded to the mold with an electrical current. When the nanoparticles are removed through a solvent, the process creates a porous nanofilm. These create higher surface area to volume structures that release drug in under a minute upon exposure to an electrical voltage.

=== Electro-responsive particle delivery systems ===
intrinsically conducting polymers can also be used to create nanoparticles to encapsulate drugs so that it can be injected directly into the body. The particles could passively accumulate at the targeted site and be locally released using an electrical stimulus. Additionally, electrical fields can be used to direct particles towards the intended site. According to Ge at al., nanoparticles made of polypyrroles which encapsulated the chemotherapeutic drug daunorubicin demonstrated that its rate of release increased when electrodes induced an electrical potential compared to diffusion. The increased rate of release occurred when the electrical potential oxidized the nanoparticles causing its positive charge to increase which repelled the negatively charged daunorubicin.

Figure 2. Micelle encapsulation of drug. The core of the micelle holds hydrophilic or water-repelling drugs while the micelle itself is made of amphiphilic ICPs. The application of an electrical stimulus can destabilize the structure allowing for the release of the drug.

Micelles composed of amphiphilic intrinsically conducting polymers can also be used to encapsulate hydrophobic drugs. According to Takeoka et al., micelles composed of methoxy poly(ethylene glycol) were bound to a terminal ferrocene which disassembled when oxidized. Ferrocene is a molecule that displays water-repelling properties when reduced but water-attractive properties when oxidized. Thus, when the ferrocene is oxidized by an electrical stimulus the micelle falls apart due to the hydrophilic properties interacting more strongly with the water rather than the micelle. Moreover, the redox reaction was reversible allowing for the model drug of perylene which was loaded in the micelle to display on/off behaviors with minimal leakage of drug when the stimulus was applied on demand.

Larger structures of intrinsically conducting polymers can also encapsulate hydrophilic drugs within the hydrophilic core of a vesicle. According to Kim et al., vesicles composed of mPEG and tetraaniline within the membrane can reversibly alter its structure upon the application of various voltages. The tetraaniline inside the membrane can form a compact structure upon being reduced but expands when oxidized which breaks apart the vesicle. The state of the structure was observed when hydrophilic dye that was loaded into the vesicles can be detected when the vesicles were oxidized.

== Mechanism of drug release ==
The mechanism by which intrinsically conducting polymers change their structure to release their cargo by electrical voltages usually results from redox reactions. Redox reactions are the transfer of electrons from one reactant to another which can alter their charge states. For instance, polypyrrole nanoparticles become negatively charged when reduced and positively charged when oxidized. When the nanoparticles are reduced, the negative charge can cause the polypyrrole to contract while the oxidation of the nanoparticle can repel positively charged drugs. By applying a positive or negative electrical voltage, the nanoparticles can be oxidized or reduced respectively to control its release at an effective level.

Electrostatic repulsion is also a key mechanism behind intrinsically conducting polymer drug release. intrinsically conducting polymer films prepared by the LbL technique release drug through the application of an electrical voltage which causes the entire stack to disassemble and release the drug encapsulated within. The released drug can also be influenced by electrical fields produced by electrodes as seen when the release of daunorubicin, a positively charged drug, can be directed to the tumor site through electrical fields.

== Applications ==
With 60% of newly developed drugs being hydrophobic, the development of electro-responsive films and nanoparticles can allow for the dissolution of these drugs in aqueous environments in the body. Thus, the application of films and nanoparticles can increase the effectiveness of drugs currently on the market as they are less likely be deactivated by enzymes in the body and filtered out of through the kidneys or liver.

For anticancer applications, nanoparticles usually accumulate at the tumor site passively through the enhanced permeability and retention effect (EPR). The EPR effect occurs in tumors where the oxygen-deficient tumor environment causes it to signal nearby cells for rapid blood vessel formation and reduce lymphatic drainage. With the rapid expansion of blood vessel cells, the vessels become leaky allowing small nanoparticles to enter the tumor site while poor drainage allows for further accumulation. Since the injected nanoparticles are sensitive to electric fields, the application of an electric field would rupture the nanoparticles in a small area allowing active delivery of the chemotherapeutic drug to the tumor site while minimizing off-target effects on the rest of the body.

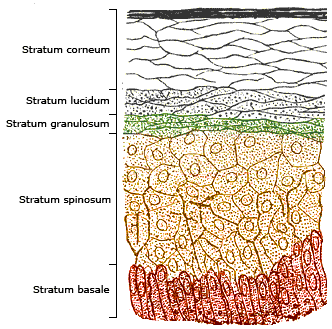
Figure 3. The epidermis skin layers including the stratum corneum.

The skin is the largest organ in the body that is composed of three layers: the epidermis, dermis, and hypodermis. These layers block and prevent the intrusion of foreign agents into the skin acting as a shield to block pathogens. However, the stratum corneum, part of the epidermis, is a major barrier that blocks the transdermal application of drugs making skin cancer treatments less effective. Experiments have shown that the application of an electrical voltage on the skin can induce electroporation on the outer skin cells allowing for the transport of drugs within the skin. With the introduction of electro-responsive hydrogels, chemotherapeutic drugs can be loaded into the gel and a voltage applied over time to increase drug access to skin cancer cells below the stratum corneum.

Electro-responsive nanoparticles can not only be used to load chemotherapeutic agents but also insulin to act as a buffer for its release in diabetic patients. Hosseini-Nassab et al. has detailed an experiment performed on mice that showed that injection of polypyrolle nanoparticles loaded with insulin are still active in reducing blood sugar levels when electrical stimulation is applied to release the insulin.

== Challenges and future development ==
Current challenges facing the electro-responsive drug delivery methods include low drug loading capacity and slow drug release rates especially for nanoparticle-based methods where it may be dispersed across the entire body. Many of these systems also may require a large voltage potential to be applied to a targeted area of the body which may interfere with proteins that are vulnerable to redox reactions. The voltage potential could also change the local pH which may cause unintended effects on the local tissue or intrinsically conducting polymer systems.

With the popularization of 3D printing, the technique has been applied to a thermoplastic polyurethane (TPU) and conductive polymer mixture which is then 3D printed. Tests have shown that the printed drug delivery platform remained conductive over 100 cycles with a rapid drug release response to voltage applied to it. This allows for real-time control of drug release across an extended period of time.
