= PH-responsive tumor-targeted drug delivery =

Cancer treatment

pH-responsive tumor-targeted drug delivery is a specialized form of targeted drug delivery that utilizes nanoparticles to deliver therapeutic drugs directly to cancerous tumor tissue while minimizing its interaction with healthy tissue. Scientists have used drug delivery as a way to modify the pharmacokinetics and targeted action of a drug by combining it with various excipients, drug carriers, and medical devices. These drug delivery systems have been created to react to the pH environment of diseased or cancerous tissues, triggering structural and chemical changes within the drug delivery system. This form of targeted drug delivery is to localize drug delivery, prolongs the drug's effect, and protect the drug from being broken down or eliminated by the body before it reaches the tumor.

== Tumor Environment ==
The microenvironment of a tumor is different compared to normal healthy tissues in the body. One distinct difference is the pH levels. The human body overall tends to have a more alkaline pH level of 7.4 while tumor tissue ranges from 7.0- 7.2 pH level, which is known as tumor acidosis. Tumor acidosis can occur due to various factors, including hypoxia, the Warburg effect, and the release of acidic metabolites by the tumor cells.

Tumor hypoxia occurs when a tumor's environment has low or severely depleted oxygen levels compared to healthy tissue, which could lead to tumor acidosis. Rapidly reproducing tumor cells become more extensive in size and do not have a sufficient blood supply. Some studies show that this leads tumor environments to become hypoxic, which then leads to metabolic changes.

The Warburg Effect refers to cancer cells using aerobic glycolysis for cell metabolism, which results in an increased rate of glucose uptake and a preference for lactate production, despite the presence of oxygen. It is still unknown why cancer cells switch their metabolism method as it is energy inefficient. Even though this method is inefficient in producing ATP, some studies show that cancer cells may be using aerobic glycolysis to produce energy because it is faster than the normal process of respiration. This process allows these malignant cells to produce energy quickly. This is particularly useful in an environment where they must rapidly grow and divide. The acidic metabolite build-up occurs due to an excess of lactate production.

As a result, targeting the acidic microenvironment of tumors has emerged as a promising strategy for cancer therapy. One approach involves the use of creating drug delivery carriers that are sensitive to pH levels and have triggered drug release at the tumor site, thereby enhancing the efficacy of chemotherapy and other treatments.

== Mechanism of pH-responsive tumor-targeted drug delivery ==
=== Mechanisms ===
pH-responsive tumor-targeted drug delivery detects the changes in the pH within the body. These polymer drug carriers carry the therapeutic drugs to allow for targeted drug delivery. The purpose of the pH- triggered drug release is to deliver the drug precisely to the area of the tumor and not activate and release the drug in healthy tissue. The complex compromises a drug delivery unit made up of a carrier molecule made up of organic nanomaterials, inorganic nanomaterials, composite nanomaterials, and anti-tumor drugs. The carrier compromises pH-sensitive molecules, which allows the drug vehicle to activate at the tumor site at the optimal pH range it is set to get triggered at and release the drug.

The loading of anti-tumor drugs into pH-responsive polymer nanomaterials can be classified into three categories: chemical bonding, intermolecular force, and physical encapsulation. These loading mechanisms allow the drug to stay within the carrier until the tumor environment has been reached. In addition, the carrier can be engineered to have the ability to modify its structure or properties in response to the pH change. Common pH-sensitive structures include chemical bonds that hydrolyze or break in acidic environments, polymers that change their charge properties with pH changes, and other special pH-responsive polymers. For example, two possible mechanisms could be applied: incorporating protonatable groups or forming acid-labile bonds. When exposed to the low pH, pH-triggered protonation/ionization changes create disturbances of the hydrophilic-hydrophobic balance within the nanocarrier, causing its disassembly and releasing the drug encapsulated within the carrier. Common ionizable groups used include amino, carboxyl, sulfonate, and imidazolyl. Depending on the introduced functional group's acid dissociation constant (pKa), drug release from these nanocarriers can occur through precipitation, aggregation, or dissociation mechanisms. Another possible carrier could be lipid-based, and a drop in pH can cleave the covalent acid-labile bonds on the surface and within the carrier leading to swelling of the drug delivery system and then release of the drug at a specific rate.

=== Advantages of pH-responsive tumor-targeted drug delivery ===
Studies have shown pH-responsive tumor-targeted drug delivery carriers to have advantages. One key advantage is the increased specificity targeting the tumor cells and comparatively low cytotoxicity compared to other therapy methods. The low toxicity results from reducing the drug or therapy exposure to healthy tissue due to the targeted approach of this drug delivery method. Another aspect noticed during previous studies is the efficiency in drug release rate. The drug carrier releases the anti-cancer drug when triggered by the tumor's low pH levels and these pH levels control the rate of drug release. Drugs administered usually require frequent dosing, but with a drug delivery carrier, it allows for a gradual and sustained release of the drug leading cancer patients to not have to be in the clinic as much for treatment.

== Types of pH- responsive drug delivery vehicles ==
=== Hydrogel based pH- triggered Drug Delivery ===
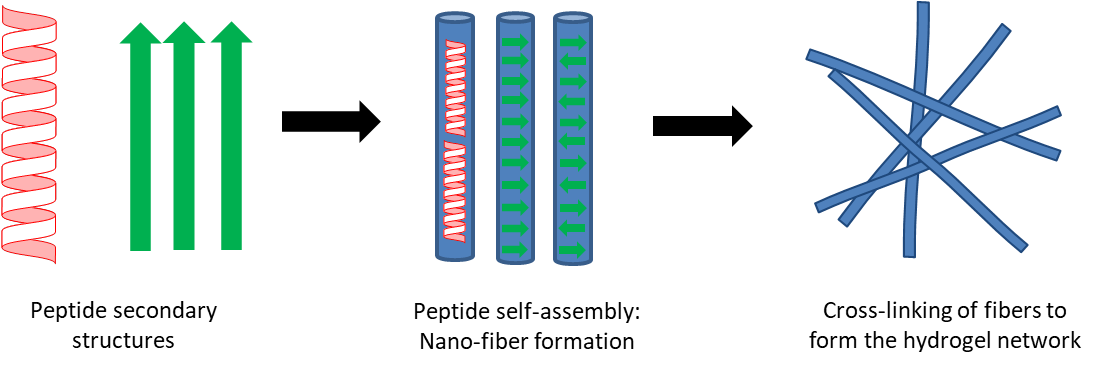
Hydrogel Crosslinking

==== Hydrogels ====
Hydrogels are networks of polymers crosslinked to form a three-dimensional structure capable of absorbing and retaining large amounts of fluids. The polymer chains contain numerous hydrophilic groups such as -NH2, -OH, -COOH, and -SO3. With increased capillary action, hydrogels are relatively insoluble unless triggered by the change in pH for tumor-targeted drug carriers. The physical properties of hydrogels can be adjusted to meet specific requirements for various drug delivery systems. pH-responsive hydrogels have been extensively developed recently and have proven particularly useful for targeted cancer treatment. They can prolong drug release and are quick and cost-effective to synthesize.

==== PEG-PLGA hydrogel nanoparticles ====
In the past decade, scientists have been working on engineering an injectable hydrogel post- resection surgery to treat tumor sites. Polylactide-co-glycolide (PLGA) and polyethylene glycol (PEG) hydrogel is an injectable biomaterial made up of is a copolymer, that has been approved by the Food and Drug Administration (FDA) for use in therapeutic devices due to its biodegradability and biocompatibility properties in the human body. There have been studies done in loading these hydrogels with cancer therapeutic drugs for localized treatment in breast tumors after surgical resection. Additionally, drug-loaded particles within the hydrogel have been proposed as dual-stimuli responsive drug delivery systems combining pH-responsivity with the temperature response of the PEGylated polyester gels. Studies show that these types of hydrogels can be used to treat tumors in lungs and bladders.

=== Liposome/Micelle based pH- triggered Drug Delivery ===
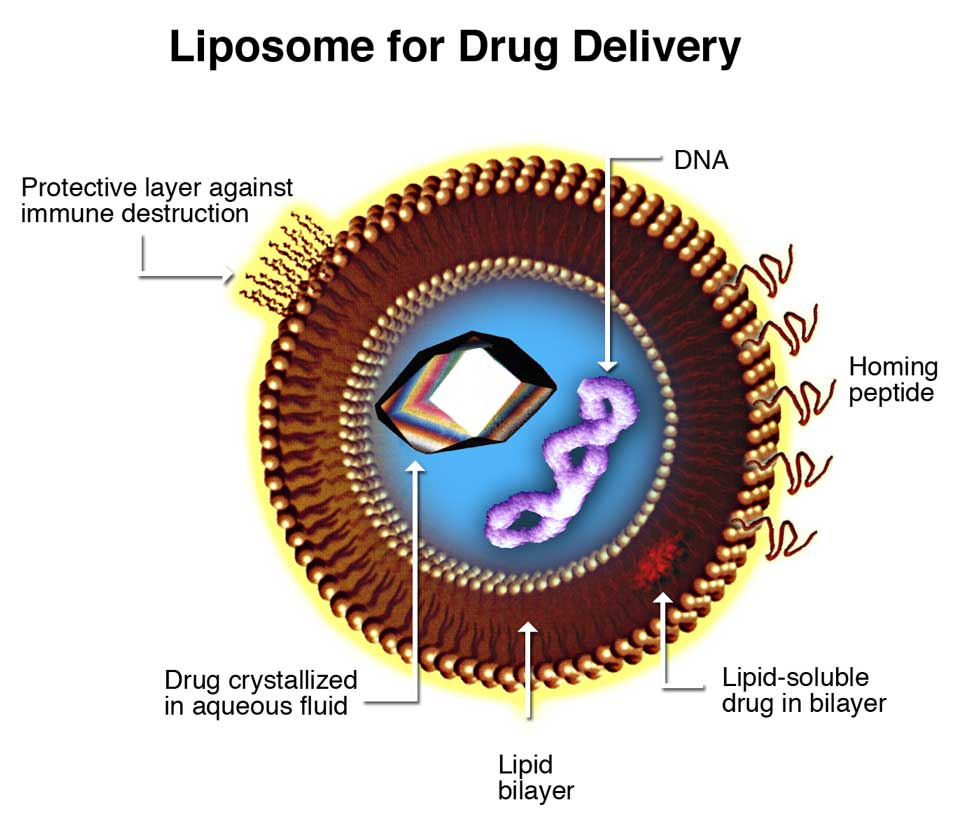
Liposomes are made of phospholipids and contain small amounts of other molecules. This is one example of a type of drug delivery carrier that can be used for pH-responsive tumor targeted drug delivery.

==== Liposomes ====
Liposomes were first reported as drug-delivery vehicles in the 1960s and are biomimetic nanosomes composed of phospholipid bilayers. Due to their biocompatibility, biodegradability, and ability to encapsulate both hydrophilic and hydrophobic drugs, liposomes are a popular choice for pH-responsive tumor-targeted drug delivery. The liposome can be modified to facilitate triggered release in response to acidic environmental conditions. These can be prepared by adding pH-sensitive components to fabricate liposomes. pH-responsive liposomes generally consist of weakly acidic amphiphile such as cholesteryl hemisuccinate (CHEMS) and cone-shaped lipids such as Dioleoylphosphatidylethanolamine (DOPE). DOPE adopts a bilayer structure at neutral pH but forms a hexagonal inverted structure, due to the low hydration of their polar head and neutralization of the negatively charged phosphodiester groups when exposed to acidic conditions, such as tumour sites, leading to destabilization and content release, while remaining stable at physiological pH. pH-responsive liposomes have some significant advantages, such as low toxicity, simple preparation, and good biocompatibility due to the biocompatible degradable components.

==== Micelles ====
Micelle Diagram

Micelles are typically formed through block polymers self-assembling which can be conjugated with different units, such as polyethylene glycol and poly(amino acid). Drug release from micelles is typically slow, resulting in low concentrations of free drugs in tumor cells and decreased therapeutic outcomes. However, introducing pH-sensitive chemical bonding arms between polymer chain segments or polymers will allow the micelle to hydrolyze quickly under weakly acidic conditions and work as an efficient drug delivery carrier for pH-responsive tumor-targeted drug delivery.

==== PEGylated doxorubicin nanoparticles ====
PEGylated liposomal doxorubicin has been studied and show results of high drug loading capacity and pH-responsive drug release within the tumor cell or tissue region. Doxorubicin is a widely used anti-cancer drug, but it has sever toxic side effects towards the cancer patients. To mitigate this, scientists are conducting tests to see how fabricating doxorubicin within the liposomal formulation can have an effect on potentially decreasing side effects through covalent bond interactions in the formation of this drug carrier type.

== Challenges and future direction ==
pH-triggered drug delivery systems are able to control the pharmacokinetics and the biodistribution of the drugs enclosed within the drug carrier and have a controlled release. Many "smart" pH-responsive drug delivery systems have not made it to clinical trials. However, there still are many challenges with this treatment method. Drug carriers for the pH-triggered release of tumors can be made out of many different combinations of materials depending on the tumor type. One of the popular materials to use is acrylamide or acrylic acid types of polymers. These polymers are harder to degrade in the body as they are not hydrolytically degradable. Another concern is how effective these carriers are in reaching the target areas. There are different methods to create these carriers to maximize the drug delivery at the site, and each method poses its own potential risks to achieve making the drug carrier. Some materials that could be used have higher molecular weights, which will not be able to be excreted via the kidneys after releasing the drug at the target area. This leads to accumulation in the body and can lead to other problems.

Another major current issue is this drug delivery system's low accuracy and off-target delivery. The heterogeneity of the tumor pH is one of the reasons for this cause. The pH of the tumor tends to become more acidic as you reach the center of the tumor. Another reason for off-target delivery could be due to the lower pH levels of lesions and inflammation sites. Studies show that this problem could be overcome by avoiding receptor-mediated active targeting with monoclonal antibodies.

Besides the drugs, conducting clinical trials can also be very expensive. When drug delivery systems tend to have high molecular weight and have a possibility of being toxic to the body due to build-up, companies tend to shy away from taking part in actively testing out these drugs clinically as it can pose a risk for the company in terms of monetary funds as well as ethical issues.

With more research and in vitro and in vivo testing, a possible solution could be found to combat these challenges. This drug delivery treatment method can be used in combination with other cancer treatment methods such as chemotherapy, gene therapy, and a combination of these therapies.
