= Stretch-triggered drug delivery =

Controlled, mechanical drug delivery

Stretch-triggered drug delivery is a method of controlled drug delivery stimulated by mechanical forces. The most commonly used materials for stretch-triggered autonomous drug release systems are hydrogels and elastomers.

This method of drug delivery falls in the category of stimuli-responsive drug delivery systems which include pH, temperature, and redox-responsive systems. Mechanical forces occur naturally throughout the human body therefore, stretch-triggered drug delivery systems may be used to autonomously deliver medications to the body when needed. The use of autonomous drug release systems reduces outcomes such as delays in receiving treatment and inaccurate dosages. Autonomous drug release systems induced by stretch apply to drugs such as antimicrobial agents, cardiovascular medication, and anticancer drugs. Theranostic agents are also applicable to this drug delivery system, allowing for simultaneous treatment and diagnosis of diseases.

== Types of Mechanical Stimuli ==
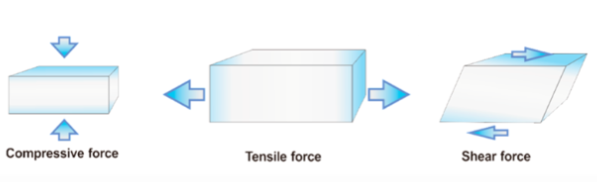
Three main types of mechanical stimuli; compression force, tensile force, and shear force.

Compression, tension, and shear are the three main types of mechanical stimuli. Compression force is when an object experiences forces from two sides, going in opposite directions, causing it to become compacted. Tensile force is when an object experiences forces from two sides, pointing in opposite directions, causing it to stretch. Shear forces are when an object experiences forces that are parallel and are going in opposite directions. Ultrasound and magnetic fields are also examples of mechanical forces. Depending on the mechanical stimuli, a different material may improve the desired results. The human body is exposed to mechanical forces on or within bones, organs, joints, blood vessels, and cartilage.

== Naturally Occurring Mechanical Stimuli ==
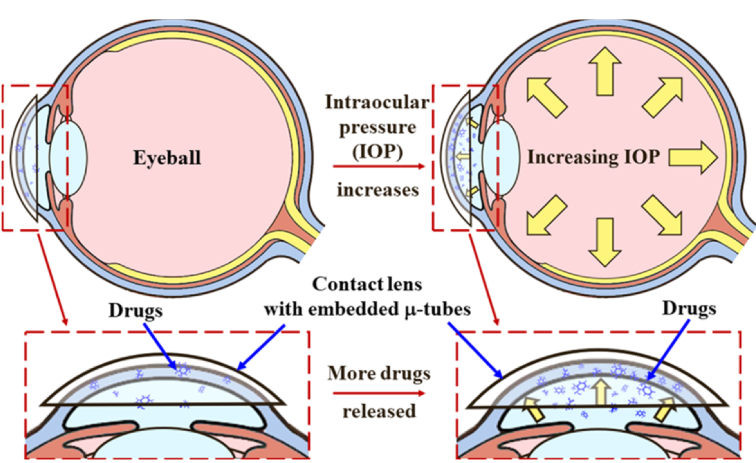
A drug release mechanism that is triggered by the stretching of the contact lens due to natural eye movements.

There are naturally occurring mechanical forces in the human body such as increased stress within blood vessels due to atherosclerotic plaque. The naturally occurring mechanical forces in the body enable the self-administration of medications. Motion-triggered drug delivery of anticancer therapy is achievable through the natural forces generated by organ movements. Research has been conducted on contact lenses that are pre-loaded with glaucoma medication that is released by the stretch of the contact lens during natural eye movements. The movement of joints has been used to trigger the release of antibacterial drugs into the body.

== Applications ==
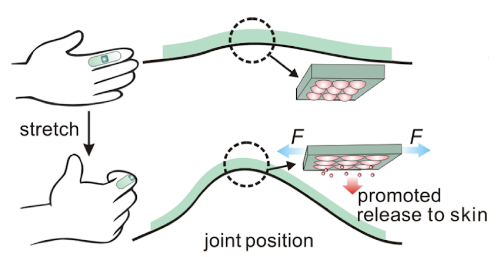
Example of a drug release system triggered by the stretching of an elastomer as a consequence of a finger bending.

Stretch-triggered drug delivery has a variety of applications. Intracellular transfection can be achieved through drug-delivery systems that are responsive to mechanical stimuli. Drug release can be controlled by triggers due to forces experienced by the body from daily motions. Mechanical triggers have been applied to polymers to release 2-furylcarbonil derivatives which then trigger the release of molecular cargo. An application of stretch-triggered drug delivery systems is the delivery of chemotherapy triggered by esophageal stent expansion. Also, the incorporation of several drugs into stretch-triggered autonomous drug release systems is a possibility, allowing drugs to be released by the same or different signals. Stretch-triggered drug delivery is also applied to nanoparticle-loaded stretchable elastomers that release drugs due to their expanded surface area. Stretch-triggered drug delivery has been applied to the cardiovascular system through the use of drug-loaded hydrogels that lead to increased vascularization. A research study demonstrated that quinine-loaded hydrogels resulted in restricted growth of bacteria as a result of exposure to stretching.

== Limitations ==
Due to the limited research on mechanical force-responsive drug delivery systems, the effects of mechanical forces on cells remain unclear. Current research on stretch-triggered drug delivery systems mostly involves in vitro studies, therefore, extensive in-vivo studies are required to further improve knowledge in this subject. A limitation of current technology is the release of drugs in the absence of tensile triggers and a limit of loading agents. Transdermal drug delivery systems may include stretch-triggered technology but these devices are typically used for long-term administration, making drug reloading a topic of concern. Issues of environmental impact are also a concern when it comes to transdermal drug delivery due to the material's lack of ability to biodegrade and associated electronic waste. An area of interest regarding drug delivery devices that use naturally occurring triggers is the variability of physiological parameters between people. This makes it difficult to set a standard of what will trigger this technology.
