= Nanocell =

Drug delivery platform

A nanocell is a drug delivery platform consisting of a polymer-bound chemotherapeutic drug combined with a lipid-bound anti-angiogenesis drug. Nanocells are currently being developed in the lab of Shiladitya Sengupta of MIT.

== Theory ==
Angiogenesis, or the formation of new blood vessels, plays a major role in the development of a tumor. After a tumor has grown to about the size of a cubic millimeter, its core becomes hypoxic, and it begins to release growth factors to recruit new blood vessels that will supply it with oxygen. Inhibiting angiogenesis has been investigated as a means of preventing tumor growth but has not proven to be fully successful, for tumor cells cut off from the blood supply can eventually develop “reactive resistance” to hypoxia. These resistant cancer cells could be killed by chemotherapeutic drugs, but once the vasculature to the tumor has been cut off, there is no way for chemotherapy to be delivered. Nanotechnology offers a way to deliver chemotherapeutic drugs and anti-angiogenic drugs in the same vehicle so that as the blood supply is shut off, chemotherapy is present to prevent any hypoxia-resistant cells from proliferating.

== Technology ==
Labs at MIT are in the process of developing nanocells capable of delivering both types of drugs. Each nanocell is between 120 and 200 _m in diameter and can be thought of as “a balloon within a balloon.” Inside each nanocell is a chemotherapeutic drug covalently bound to a polymer, and on the surface of each cell is a lipid coat containing an anti-angiogenic drug. The technology makes use of the fact that a tumor's blood vessels have pores 600 _m in diameter and are much leakier than normal blood vessels, which have pores only around 50 _m in diameter. The nanocells circulate in the blood, and because of their size, they leak out of blood vessels only in tumors. Once there, the nanocells are degraded by enzymes produced by the tumor. Work remains to be done to win clinical approval for the technology, but results from Sengupta's lab indicate that the nanocells are more effective and less toxic than traditional chemotherapy.
