= Smart drug =

Smart drug may refer to:

- Nootropic, a drug which purportedly improves mental functions
- A pharmaceutical capable of discriminating between diseased and healthy cells, as in targeted therapy or targeted drug delivery
