= Magnetic particle imaging =

Non-invasive medical imaging technique

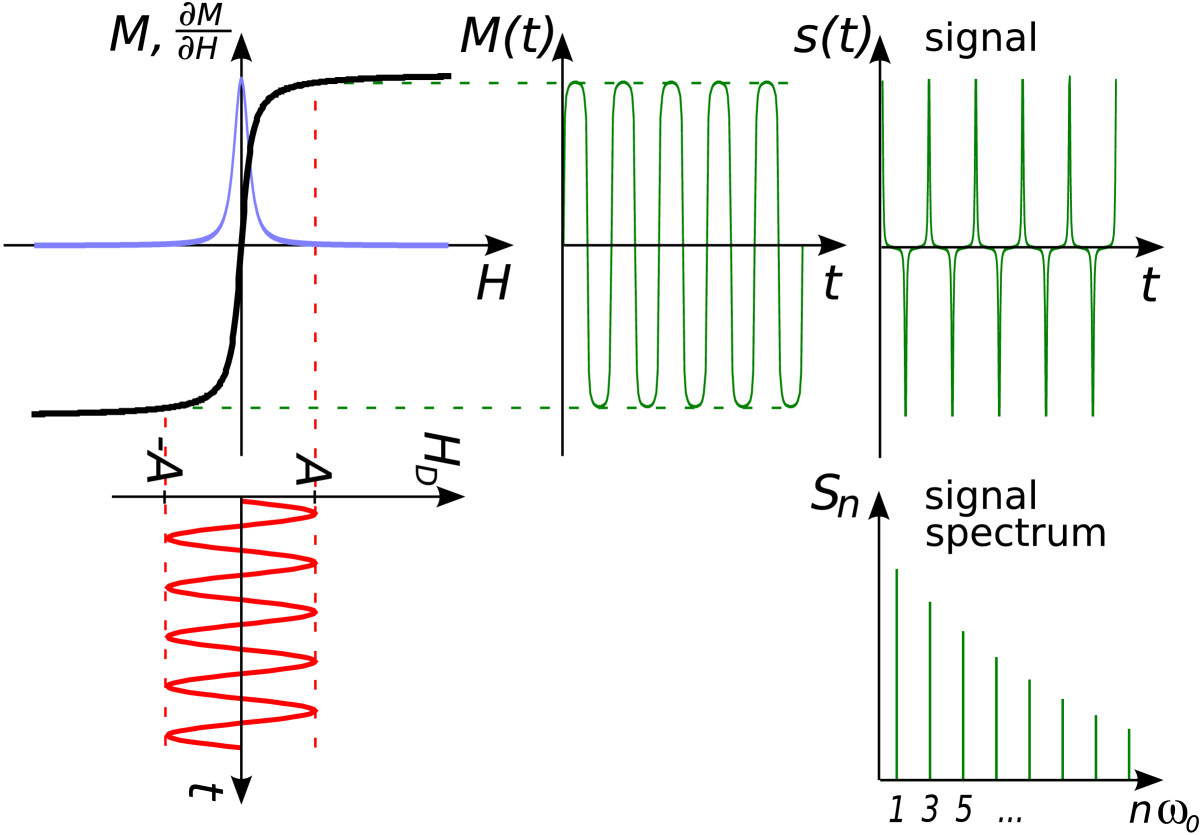
Principles of signal generation within magnetic particle imaging (MPI)

Magnetic particle imaging (MPI) is an emerging non-invasive tomographic imaging technique that directly detects the spatial distribution of superparamagnetic nanoparticle tracers. The technology has potential applications in diagnostic imaging and material science. Currently, it is used in medical research to measure the 3-D location and concentration of nanoparticles. Imaging does not use ionizing radiation and can produce a signal at any depth within the body. MPI was invented in 2001 by the industrial scientists Bernhard Gleich and Jürgen Weizenecker, while working at the Hamburg-site of the Philips Research Labs. They published their first system in 2005 and were later awarded the prestigious European Inventor Award. Since then, the technology has been advanced by industry as well as academic researchers at several universities in Germany and around the world. From 2011 to 2016, the BMBF-funded MAPIT (Magnetic Particle Imaging Technology) research project was carried out with industrial and academic partners, during which Philips Research in Hamburg built the world's first whole-body scanner. The first commercial MPI scanners for small animals became available from Bruker Biospin in Germany and later on Magnetic Insight in the United States.

The hardware used for MPI is very different from MRI. Whilst both techniques are based on magnetic fields and use coils to transmit and receive these fields, they differ greatly in technical details such as the geometries of the magnetic fields used, their amplitudes, and their frequencies. MPI systems use changing magnetic fields to generate a signal from superparamagnetic iron oxide (SPIO) nanoparticles. These fields are specifically designed to produce a single magnetic field free point. A signal is only generated at and very near to this point. An image is generated by moving this point across a sample. Since there is no natural SPIO in tissue, a signal is only detected from the administered tracer. This provides images without background. MPI is often used in combination with anatomical imaging techniques (such as CT or MRI) providing information on the location of the tracer.

== Applications ==
Magnetic particle imaging combines high tracer sensitivity with submillimeter resolution. Imaging is performed in a range of milliseconds to seconds. The iron oxide tracer used with MPI are cleared naturally by the body through the mononuclear phagocyte system. The iron oxide nanoparticles are broken down in the liver, where the iron is stored and used to produce hemoglobin. SPIOs have previously been used in humans for iron supplementation and liver imaging.

=== Blood pool imaging ===
Cardiovascular

The first in vivo MPI results provided images of a beating mouse heart in 2009. Using a Traveling Wave Magnetic Particle Imaging (TWMPI) scanner, dynamic results of a beating mouse heart, with high enough spatial resolution, were obtained in 2016. These studies used the more common resovist imaging tracer while a new study demonstrated LS-008 has a clear advantage for MPI with better image quality and a longer half-life within the blood allowing for longer circulation times. With further research, this could eventually be used for real-time cardiac imaging due to MPI’s dynamic capturing of blood flow entering and exiting the heart.

==== Oncology ====
MPI has numerous applications to the field of oncology research. Accumulation of a tracer within solid tumors can occur through the enhanced permeability and retention effect. This has been successfully used to detect tumor sites within rats. The high sensitivity of the technique means it may also be possible to image micro-metastasis through the development of nanoparticles targeted to cancer cells. MPI is being investigated as a clinical alternative screening technique to nuclear medicine in order to reduce radiation exposure in at-risk populations.

=== Cell tracking ===
By tagging therapeutic cells with iron oxide nanoparticles, MPI allows them to be tracked throughout the body. This has applications in regenerative medicine and cancer immunotherapy. Imaging can be used to improve the success of stem cell therapy by following the movement of these cells in the body. The tracer is stable while tagged to a cell and remains detectable past 87 days.

=== Functional brain imaging ===
MPI has been proposed as a promising platform for functional brain imaging that requires highly sensitive imaging as well as short scan times for sufficient temporal resolution. For this, MPI is used to detect the increase of cerebral blood volume (CBV) arising from neuroactivation. Functional neuroimaging using MPI has been successfully demonstrated in rodents and has a promising sensitivity advantage compared to other imaging modalities. In the long perspective, this could potentially allow to study functional neuroactivation on a single-patient level and thus bring functional neuroimaging to clinical diagnostics.

== Superparamagnetic tracer ==
The tracers used in magnetic particle imaging (MPI) are superparamagnetic iron oxide nanoparticles (SPIONs). They are composed of a magnetite (Fe_{3}O_{4}) or maghemite (Fe_{2}O_{3}) core surrounded by a surface coating (commonly dextran, carboxydextran, or polyethylene glycol).

The SPION tracer is detectable within biological fluids, such as the blood. This fluid is very responsive to even weak magnetic fields, and all of the magnetic moments will line up in the direction of an induced magnetic field. These particles can be used because the human body does not contain anything which will create magnetic interference in imaging. As the sole tracer, the properties of SPIONs are of key importance to the signal intensity and resolution of MPI. Iron oxide nanoparticles, due to their magnetic dipoles, exhibit a spontaneous magnetization that can be controlled by an applied magnetic field. Therefore, the performance of SPIONs in MPI is critically dependent on their magnetic properties, such as saturation magnetization, magnetic diameter, and relaxation mechanism. Upon application of an external magnetic field, the relaxation of SPIONs can be governed by two mechanisms, Néel, and Brownian relaxation. When the entire particle rotates with respect to the environment, it is following Brownian relaxation, which is affected by the physical diameter. When only the magnetic dipole rotates within the particles, the mechanism is called Néel relaxation, which is affected by the magnetic diameter. According to the Langevin model of superparamagnetism, the spatial resolution of MPI should improve cubically with the magnetics diameter, which can be obtained by fitting magnetization versus magnetic field curve to a Langevin model. However, more recent calculations suggest that there exists an optimal SPIONs magnetic size range (~26 nm) for MPI. This is because of blurring caused by Brownian relaxation of large magnetics size SPIONs. Although magnetic size critically affects the MPI performance, it is often poorly analyzed in publications reporting applications of MPI using SPIONs. Often, commercially available tracers or home-made tracers are used without thorough magnetic characterization. Importantly, due to spin canting and disorder at the surface, or due to the formation of mixed-phase nanoparticles, the equivalent magnetic diameter can be smaller than the physical diameter. And magnetic diameter is critical because of the response of particles to an applied magnetic field dependent on the magnetic diameter, not physical diameter. The largest equivalent magnetic diameter can be the same as the physical diameter. A recent review paper by Chandrasekharan et al. summarizes properties of various iron oxide contrast agents and their MPI performance measured using their in-house Magnetic Particle Spectrometer, shown in the picture here. It should be pointed out that the core diameter listed in the table is not necessarily the magnetic diameter. The table provides a comparison of all current published SPIONs for MPI contrast agents. As seen in the table, LS017, with a SPION core size of 28.7 nm and synthesized through heating up thermal decomposition with post-synthesis oxidation, has the best resolution compared with others with lower core size. Resovist (Ferucarbotran), consisting of iron oxide made via coprecipitation, is the most commonly used and commercially available tracer. However, as suggested by Gleich et al., only 3% of the total iron mass from Resovist contributes to the MPI signal due to its polydispersity, leading to relatively low MPI sensitivity. The signal intensity of MPI is influenced by both the magnetic core diameter and the size distribution of SPIONs. Comparing the MPI sensitivity listed in the above table, LS017 has the highest signal intensity (54.57 V/g of Fe) as particles are monodisperse and possess a large magnetic diameter compared with others.

The surface coating also plays a key role in determining the behavior of the SPIONs. It minimizes unwanted interactions between the iron oxide cores (for example, counteracting attractive forces between the particles to prevent aggregation), increases stability and compatibility with the biological environment, and can also be used to tailor SPION performance to particular imaging applications. Different coatings cause changes in cellular uptake, blood circulation, and interactions with the immune system, influencing how the tracer becomes distributed throughout the body over time. For example, SPIONs coated with carboxydextran have been shown to clear to the liver almost immediately after injection, while those with a polyethylene glycol (PEG) coating remain in circulation for hours before being cleared from the blood. These behaviors make the carboxydextran-coated SPION tracer better optimized for liver imaging and the PEG-coated SPION tracer more suitable for vascular imaging.

== Open hardware and software ==
MPI scanners combine selection-field generation (using permanent magnets or electromagnets) with drive and receive coils, low-noise receive electronics, and synchronized data acquisition. Control and reconstruction software coordinates waveform generation, scanner timing, calibration procedures, and image reconstruction. To lower the barrier to building research scanners and to improve reproducibility, some MPI groups publish open hardware designs and software toolchains. The Open-Source Magnetic Particle Imaging (OS-MPI) initiative collects and distributes designs and documentation for MPI systems and supporting devices. The open-source repository includes designs for a full small-bore field-free line (FFL) imager, a magnetic particle spectrometer for characterizing tracer materials, a pre-amplifier for signal detection, and a winding jig for manufacturing electromagnets.

== Advantages ==
- High spatial resolution (<1 mm)
- Rapid image acquisition/temporal resolution (<0.1s)
- Zero radiation exposure
- High contrast
- Deep tissue penetration

== See also ==
- Passive dual coil resonator – Passive receive coil insert for magnetic particle imaging systems
