= Targeted drug delivery =

Method of delivering medication

Targeted drug delivery, sometimes called smart drug delivery, is a method of delivering medication to a patient in a manner that increases the concentration of the medication in some parts of the body relative to others. This means of delivery is largely founded on nanomedicine, which plans to employ nanoparticle-mediated drug delivery in order to combat the downfalls of conventional drug delivery. These nanoparticles would be loaded with drugs and targeted to specific parts of the body where there is solely diseased tissue, thereby avoiding interaction with healthy tissue. The goal of a targeted drug delivery system is to prolong, localize, target and have a protected drug interaction with the diseased tissue. The conventional drug delivery system is the absorption of the drug across a biological membrane, whereas the targeted release system releases the drug in a dosage form. The advantages to the targeted release system is the reduction in the frequency of the dosages taken by the patient, having a more uniform effect of the drug, reduction of drug side-effects, and reduced fluctuation in circulating drug levels. The disadvantage of the system is high cost, which makes productivity more difficult, and the reduced ability to adjust the dosages.

Targeted drug delivery systems have been developed to optimize regenerative techniques. The system is based on a method that delivers a certain amount of a therapeutic agent for a prolonged period of time to a targeted diseased area within the body. This helps maintain the required plasma and tissue drug levels in the body, thereby preventing any damage to the healthy tissue via the drug. The drug delivery system is highly integrated and requires various disciplines, such as chemists, biologists, and engineers, to join forces to optimize this system.

== Background ==
In traditional drug delivery systems such as oral ingestion or intravascular injection, the medication is distributed throughout the body through the systemic blood circulation. For most therapeutic agents, only a small portion of the medication reaches the organ to be affected, such as in chemotherapy where roughly 99% of the drugs administered do not reach the tumor site. Targeted drug delivery seeks to concentrate the medication in the tissues of interest while reducing the relative concentration of the medication in the remaining tissues. For example, by avoiding the host's defense mechanisms and inhibiting non-specific distribution in the liver and spleen, a system can reach the intended site of action in higher concentrations. Targeted delivery is believed to improve efficacy while reducing side-effects.

When implementing a targeted release system, the following design criteria for the system must be taken into account: the drug properties, side-effects of the drugs, the route taken for the delivery of the drug, the targeted site, and the disease.

Increasing developments to novel treatments requires a controlled microenvironment that is accomplished only through the implementation of therapeutic agents whose side-effects can be avoided with targeted drug delivery. Advances in the field of targeted drug delivery to cardiac tissue will be an integral component to regenerate cardiac tissue.

There are two kinds of targeted drug delivery: active targeted drug delivery, such as some antibody medications, and passive targeted drug delivery, such as the enhanced permeability and retention effect (EPR-effect).

== Targeting methods ==
This ability for nanoparticles to concentrate in areas of solely diseased tissue is accomplished through either one or both means of targeting: passive or active.

=== Passive targeting ===
Passive targeting is achieved by incorporating the therapeutic agent into a macromolecule or nanoparticle that passively reaches the target organ. In passive targeting, the drug's success is directly related to circulation time. This is achieved by cloaking the nanoparticle with some sort of coating. Several substances can achieve this, with one of them being polyethylene glycol (PEG). By adding PEG to the surface of the nanoparticle, it is rendered hydrophilic, thus allowing water molecules to bind to the oxygen molecules on PEG via hydrogen bonding. The result of this bond is a film of hydration around the nanoparticle which makes the substance antiphagocytic. The particles obtain this property due to the hydrophobic interactions that are natural to the reticuloendothelial system (RES), thus the drug-loaded nanoparticle is able to stay in circulation for a longer period of time. To work in conjunction with this mechanism of passive targeting, nanoparticles that are between 10 and 100 nanometers in size have been found to circulate systemically for longer periods of time.

=== Active targeting ===
Active targeting of drug-loaded nanoparticles enhances the effects of passive targeting to make the nanoparticle more specific to a target site. There are several ways that active targeting can be accomplished. One way to actively target solely diseased tissue in the body is to know the nature of a receptor on the cell for which the drug will be targeted to. Researchers can then utilize cell-specific ligands that will allow the nanoparticle to bind specifically to the cell that has the complementary receptor. This form of active targeting was found to be successful when utilizing transferrin as the cell-specific ligand. The transferrin was conjugated to the nanoparticle to target tumor cells that possess transferrin-receptor mediated endocytosis mechanisms on their membrane. This means of targeting was found to increase uptake, as opposed to non-conjugated nanoparticles. Another cell-specific ligand is the RGD motif which binds to the integrin αvβ3. This integrin is upregulated in tumor and activated endothelial cells. Conjugation of RGD to chemotherapeutic-loaded nanoparticles has been shown to increase cancer cell uptake in vitro and therapeutic efficacy in vivo.

Active targeting can also be achieved by utilizing magnetoliposomes, which usually serves as a contrast agent in magnetic resonance imaging. Thus, by grafting these liposomes with a desired drug to deliver to a region of the body, magnetic positioning could aid with this process.

Furthermore, a nanoparticle could possess the capability to be activated by a trigger that is specific to the target site, such as utilizing materials that are pH responsive. Most of the body has a consistent, neutral pH. However, some areas of the body are naturally more acidic than others, and, thus, nanoparticles can take advantage of this ability by releasing the drug when it encounters a specific pH. Another specific triggering mechanism is based on the redox potential. One of the side effects of tumors is hypoxia, which alters the redox potential in the vicinity of the tumor. By modifying the redox potential that triggers the payload release the vesicles can be selective to different types of tumors.

By utilizing both passive and active targeting, a drug-loaded nanoparticle has a heightened advantage over a conventional drug. It is able to circulate throughout the body for an extended period of time until it is successfully attracted to its target through the use of cell-specific ligands, magnetic positioning, or pH responsive materials. Because of these advantages, side effects from conventional drugs will be largely reduced as a result of the drug-loaded nanoparticles affecting only diseased tissue. However, an emerging field known as nanotoxicology has concerns that the nanoparticles themselves could pose a threat to both the environment and human health with side effects of their own. Active targeting can also be achieved through peptide based drug targeting system.

== Delivery vehicles ==
There are different types of drug delivery vehicles, such as polymeric micelles, liposomes, lipoprotein-based drug carriers, nano-particle drug carriers, dendrimers, etc. An ideal drug delivery vehicle must be non-toxic, biocompatible, non-immunogenic, biodegradable, and must avoid recognition by the host's defense mechanisms^{[3]}.

=== Peptides ===
Cell Surface Peptides provide one way to introduce drug delivery into a target cell. This method is accomplished by the peptide binding to a target cells surface receptors, in a way that bypasses immune defenses that would otherwise compromise a slower delivery, without causing harm to the host. In particular, peptides, such as intercellular adhesion molecule-1, have shown a great deal of binding ability in a target cell. This method has shown a degree of efficacy in treating both autoimmune diseases as well as forms of cancer as a result of this binding affinity. Peptide mediated delivery is also of promise due to the low cost of creating the peptides as well as the simplicity of their structure.

=== Liposomes ===
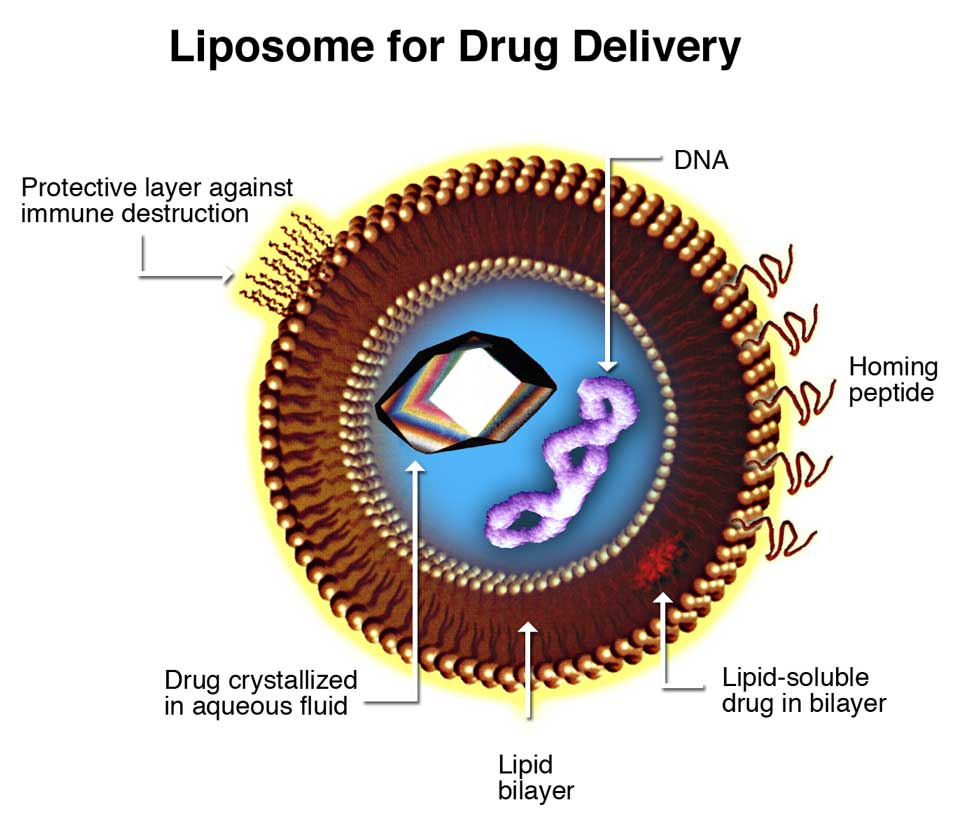
Liposomes are composite structures made of phospholipids and may contain small amounts of other molecules. Though liposomes can vary in size from low micrometer range to tens of micrometers, unilamellar liposomes, as pictured here, are typically in the lower size range, with various targeting ligands attached to their surface, allowing for their surface-attachment and accumulation in pathological areas for treatment of disease.

The most common vehicle currently used for targeted drug delivery is the liposome. Liposomes are non-toxic, non-hemolytic, and non-immunogenic even upon repeated injections; they are biocompatible and biodegradable and can be designed to avoid clearance mechanisms (reticuloendothelial system (RES), renal clearance, chemical or enzymatic inactivation, etc.) Lipid-based, ligand-coated nanocarriers can store their payload in the hydrophobic shell or the hydrophilic interior depending on the nature of the drug/contrast agent being carried.

The only problem to using liposomes in vivo is their immediate uptake and clearance by the RES system and their relatively low stability in vitro. To combat this, polyethylene glycol (PEG) can be added to the surface of the liposomes. Increasing the mole percent of PEG on the surface of the liposomes by 4-10% significantly increased circulation time in vivo from 200 to 1000 minutes.

PEGylation of the liposomal nanocarrier elongates the half-life of the construct while maintaining the passive targeting mechanism that is commonly conferred to lipid-based nanocarriers. When used as a delivery system, the ability to induce instability in the construct is commonly exploited allowing the selective release of the encapsulated therapeutic agent in close proximity to the target tissue/cell in vivo. This nanocarrier system is commonly used in anti-cancer treatments as the acidity of the tumour mass caused by an over-reliance on glycolysis triggers drug release.

Additional endogenous trigger pathways have been explored through the exploitation of inner and outer tumor environments, such as reactive oxygen species, glutathione, enzymes, hypoxia, and adenosine-5'- triphosphate (ATP), all of which are generally highly present in and around tumors. External triggers are also used, such as light, low frequency ultrasound (LFUS), electrical fields, and magnetic fields. In specific, LFUS has demonstrated high efficacy in the controlled trigger of various drugs in mice, such as cisplatin and calcein.

=== Micelles and dendrimers ===
Another type of drug delivery vehicle used is polymeric micelles. They are prepared from certain amphiphilic co-polymers consisting of both hydrophilic and hydrophobic monomer units. They can be used to carry drugs that have poor solubility. This method offers little in the terms of size control or function malleability. Techniques that utilize reactive polymers along with a hydrophobic additive to produce a larger micelle that create a range of sizes have been developed.

Dendrimers are also polymer-based delivery vehicles. They have a core that branches out in regular intervals to form a small, spherical, and very dense nanocarrier.

=== Biodegradable particles ===
Biodegradable particles have the ability to target diseased tissue as well as deliver their payload as a controlled-release therapy. Biodegradable particles bearing ligands to P-selectin, endothelial selectin (E-selectin) and ICAM-1 have been found to adhere to inflamed endothelium. Therefore, the use of biodegradable particles can also be used for cardiac tissue.

=== Microalgae-based delivery ===
There are biocompatible microalgae hybrid microrobots for active drug-delivery in the lungs and the gastrointestinal tract. The microrobots proved effective in tests with mice. In the two studies, "Fluorescent dye or cell membrane–coated nanoparticle functionalized algae motors were further embedded inside a pH-sensitive capsule" and "antibiotic-loaded neutrophil membrane-coated polymeric nanoparticles [were attached] to natural microalgae".

=== Artificial DNA nanostructures ===
The success of DNA nanotechnology in constructing artificially designed nanostructures out of nucleic acids such as DNA, combined with the demonstration of systems for DNA computing, has led to speculation that artificial nucleic acid nanodevices can be used to target drug delivery based upon directly sensing its environment. These methods make use of DNA solely as a structural material and a chemical, and do not make use of its biological role as the carrier of genetic information. Nucleic acid logic circuits that could potentially be used as the core of a system that releases a drug only in response to a stimulus such as a specific mRNA have been demonstrated. In addition, a DNA "box" with a controllable lid has been synthesized using the DNA origami method. This structure could encapsulate a drug in its closed state, and open to release it only in response to a desired stimulus.

== Applications ==
Targeted drug delivery can be used to treat many diseases, such as the cardiovascular diseases and diabetes. However, the most important application of targeted drug delivery is to treat cancerous tumors. In doing so, the passive method of targeting tumors takes advantage of the enhanced permeability and retention (EPR) effect. This is a situation specific to tumors that results from rapidly forming blood vessels and poor lymphatic drainage. When the blood vessels form so rapidly, large fenestrae result that are 100 to 600 nanometers in size, which allows enhanced nanoparticle entry. Further, the poor lymphatic drainage means that the large influx of nanoparticles are rarely leaving, thus, the tumor retains more nanoparticles for successful treatment to take place.

The American Heart Association rates cardiovascular disease as the number one cause of death in the United States. Each year 1.5 million myocardial infarctions (MI), also known as heart attacks, occur in the United States, with 500,000 leading to deaths. The costs related to heart attacks exceed $60 billion per year. Therefore, there is a need to come up with an optimum recovery system. The key to solving this problem lies in the effective use of pharmaceutical drugs that can be targeted directly to the diseased tissue. This technique can help develop many more regenerative techniques to cure various diseases. The development of a number of regenerative strategies in recent years for curing heart disease represents a paradigm shift away from conventional approaches that aim to manage heart disease.

Stem cell therapy can be used to help regenerate myocardium tissue and return the contractile function of the heart by creating/supporting a microenvironment before the MI. Developments in targeted drug delivery to tumors have provided the groundwork for the burgeoning field of targeted drug delivery to cardiac tissue. Recent developments have shown that there are different endothelial surfaces in tumors, which has led to the concept of endothelial cell adhesion molecule-mediated targeted drug delivery to tumors.

Liposomes can be used as drug delivery for the treatment of tuberculosis. The traditional treatment for TB is skin to chemotherapy which is not overly effective, which may be due to the failure of chemotherapy to make a high enough concentration at the infection site. The liposome delivery system allows for better microphage penetration and better builds a concentration at the infection site. The delivery of the drugs works intravenously and by inhalation. Oral intake is not advised because the liposomes break down in the Gastrointestinal System.

3D printing is also used by doctors to investigate how to target cancerous tumors in a more efficient way. By printing a plastic 3D shape of the tumor and filling it with the drugs used in the treatment the flow of the liquid can be observed allowing the modification of the doses and targeting location of the drugs.

== See also ==
- Targeted therapy
- Nanomedicine
- Nanobiotechnology § Nanomedicine
- Antibody-drug conjugate
- Retrometabolic drug design
- Magnetic drug delivery
- PH-responsive tumor-targeted drug delivery
- Erythrocyte-based drug delivery
- Electro-responsive drug delivery
