= Hiroshi Maeda (chemist) =

Japanese pharmacologist and chemist (1938–2021)

- Born: 前田 浩 22 December 1938; Hyōgo Prefecture, Japan
- Died: 18 May 2021 (aged 82); Kumamoto, Japan
- Education: Tohoku University; University of California, Davis
- Known for: EPR effect
- Awards: Princess Takamatsu Cancer Research Fund Prizes; Clarivate Citation Laureates (2016)
- Scientific career
- Fields: Chemistry
- Workplaces: Sojo University; Kumamoto University; Harvard University

Hiroshi Maeda (前田浩, Maeda Hiroshi; 22 December 1938 – 18 May 2021) was a Japanese pharmacologist and chemist. He was known for his discovery of EPR effect. He published more than 650 papers in reputed journals; the h-index is 115 (Google scholar, As of 2022).

== Education and career ==
Maeda studied at Tohoku University with a bachelor's degree in 1962, at the University of California, Davis with a master's degree in 1964, and a doctorate in 1967 at Tohoku. He was a post-doctoral at the Sidney Farber Cancer Institute of Harvard University from 1967 to 1971, he also acquired the medical doctorate there.

From 1971 to 1980 he was an assistant professor at Kumamoto University and became a professor from 1980.

== Research ==
Maeda developed the neocarzinostatin "SMANCS" with a copolymer of styrene and maleic acid in 1979. Afterward, Maeda and his student Yasuhiro Matsumura discovered the Enhanced permeability and retention effect (ERP effect) of macromolecular drugs in 1986, which laid an important foundation for the cancer-targeted therapy (CAncer Stromal Targeting; CAST).

== Recognition ==
Maeda was awarded Princess Takamatsu Cancer Research Fund Prizes, Commemorative Gold Medal of E.K.Frey-E.Werle, Life Time Achievement Award of Royal Pharmaceutical Society, CRS College of Fellows Award, Nagai Innovation Award for Outstanding Achievement (2013), and Clarivate Citation Laureates (2016).

He was also a member of Controlled Release Society.
