= Erythrocyte-based drug delivery =

Drug delivery method

Erythrocyte-based drug delivery systems (EBDDS) use red blood cells, their membranes, or their components to release and deliver pharmaceutical agents throughout the body in a controlled manner. Because red blood cells circulate for long periods of time and are potentially non-immunogenic, they are an attractive vector for drug delivery via the circulatory system. Erythrocytes can be used intact as carriers, or alternately empty erythrocyte membranes or nanoscale vesicles derived from erythrocytes may be used.

== Key advantages ==
As early as 1973, it was recognized that red blood cells can be loaded with therapeutic enzymes, in order to avoid a possible immune reaction to the enzyme or rapid degradation of the enzyme if injected directly into blood. In humans, red blood cells have a half-life in circulation of 10–15 days before clearance by the lymphoreticular system and exhibit a natural tendency to absorb a variety of drugs. Together, these properties allow for controlled release of pharmaceutical products over an extended time, and/or targeting of erythrocyte-destroying cells such as macrophages in the spleen or liver. One of the earliest proposed applications of EBDDS was in enzyme replacement therapy for Gaucher disease, in which lipids accumulate in spleen macrophages; the enzymes not present in this disease could thus be delivered directly to macrophages by red blood cells.

Furthermore, red blood cells are not immunogenic as long as the blood type is compatible with the recipient. This property allows potentially immunogenic substances such as proteins to be safely carried through the bloodstream.

== Variants ==
There are several variations on the concept of erythrocytes as drug carriers. In the simplest application, erythrocytes may be simply mixed with a membrane-permeable drug and allowed to equilibrate until the drug has been absorbed via dialysis. Alternately, a prodrug may be incubated with the erythrocytes, and enzyme activity within the cells gradually converts the prodrug to its active form, further prolonging delivery. If the drug or prodrug is not membrane-permeable, membrane-permeating peptides may be added to permeabilize the plasma membrane of the erythrocytes.

If the therapeutic agent of interest is a protein, it may be coupled to the surface of the erythrocyte by linking biotin to the protein and to another molecule on the erythrocyte surface, and then adding streptavidin to bridge the two. Similarly, therapeutic nanoparticles may attach to or embed in the red cell membranes or glycocalyx based on the chemical and physical properties of their surface ligands.

For some therapeutic proteins it is only feasible to encapsulate the protein within the red cell membrane. In these cases the red blood cells must be partially lysed under isotonic conditions in the presence of the protein to be loaded, forming re-sealed erythrocytes or erythrocyte ghosts containing the protein of interest.

In other applications, therapeutic nanoparticles larger than proteins but smaller than erythrocytes may be "cloaked" in red blood cell membranes in order to evade immune reaction or prolong circulation. This may be accomplished by hypotonic lysis or extrusion of intact red cells, followed by re-extrusion in the presence of the nanoparticles. This approach may also be used to encapsulate small molecules in vesicles made from the plasma membrane of erythrocytes, if delivery particles smaller than intact cells are desired.

== Applications ==
=== Enzyme replacement therapy ===
The original application of erythrocytes for drug delivery was in enzyme replacement therapy, and several variants of this concept have been developed. For example, glutamine synthetase, adenosine deaminase, and β-galactosidase have been successfully encapsulated within erythrocytes to treat metabolic conditions.

=== Cancer therapy ===
EBDDSs have been studied as delivery systems for chemotherapy agents. For instance, erythrocyte-encapsulated L-asparaginase has been studied as a therapy for acute lymphoblastic leukemia (ALL) and pancreatic ductal adenocarcinoma (PDAC). Animal studies of erythrocyte-encapsulated doxorubicin showed promise against lymphoid cancers and reduced cardiotoxicity relative to nonencapsulated doxorubicin.

=== Steroid delivery ===
Steroid agents such as corticosteroids, which often suffer poor bioavailability, can be successfully delivered using EBDDS. Erythrocyte delivery of the corticosteroid derivative dexamethasone 21-phosphate has been approved by the European Medical Agency as an orphan technology for treatment of ulcerative colitis. This system is also being investigated for conditions including Crohn's disease, chronic obstructive pulmonary disease, and cystic fibrosis.

== See also ==
- Drug Carrier
- Blood Substitute
- Drug Delivery
- Cancer Therapy
- Erythrocyte Sedimentation Rate
- Intracellular Delivery
- Immunomodulation
- Immunotherapy
