= Passive dual coil resonator =

Passive receive coil insert for magnetic particle imaging systems

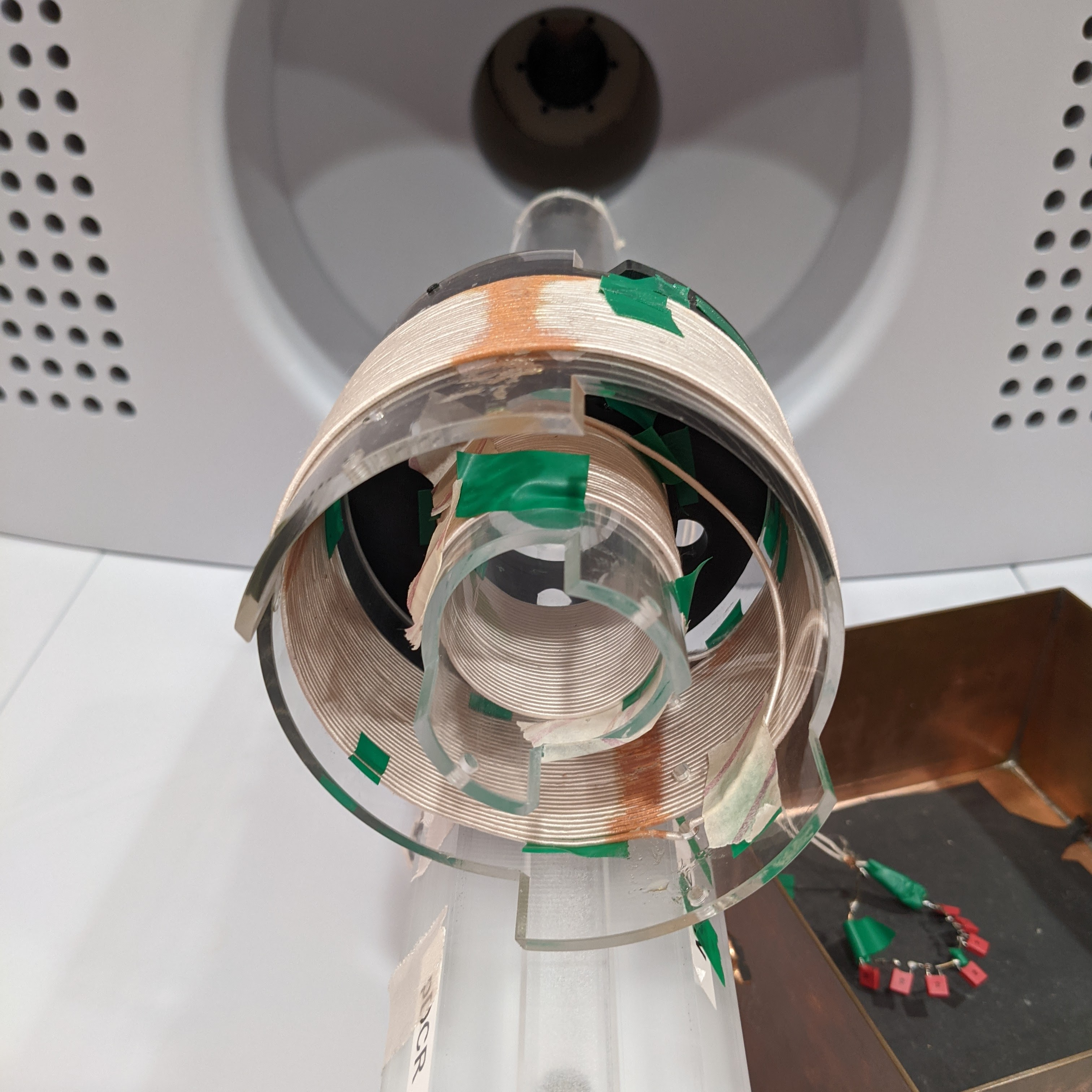
Photograph of an assembled pDCR in front of an MPI bore.

A passive dual coil resonator (pDCR) is a purely passive receive coil insert for a preclinical magnetic particle imaging (MPI) system which provides frequency-selective signal enhancement. The pDCR aims to enhance the frequency components associated with high mixing orders, which are critical to achieve a high spatial resolution.

== Motivation ==
One of the biggest challenges in MPI is to achieve a good signal-to-noise ratio, especially for higher harmonics. The intention behind this is that as many harmonics of the induced particle signal as possible, which drop in intensity at higher frequencies and then disappear in the noise floor, should be usable for image reconstruction to reach a better spatial resolution. To enhance the harmonics at higher frequencies, one aims to increase the inductive coupling between the particles and the receive coils at higher harmonics.

== Design ==
As the name suggests, the pDCR, which consists of two coaxial coils, is passive because it does not have a voltage source and also no electrical connection to the rest of the MPI scanner system. The pDCR represents a resonant circuit and therefore also includes a capacitor. The pDCR picks up the particles’ magnetization response mainly with its interior coil. It then sends out the received signal with its exterior coil, but enhanced in the range of its resonant frequency. This output is then picked up by the scanner’s receive coils. There will be coupling between all the different coils of the scanner and the pDCR, however, the described process will dominate. The pDCR, i.e. the resonant circuit, is tuned to a frequency near the frequency at which the harmonics of the signal disappear into the noise floor and thus serves its function as mentioned above.
