= Stimuli-responsive drug delivery systems =

Targeted drug delivery systems

Conventional drug delivery is limited by the inability to control dosing, target specific sites, and achieve targeted permeability. Traditional methods of delivering therapeutics to the body experience challenges in achieving and maintaining maximum therapeutic effect while avoiding the effects of drug toxicity. Many drugs that are delivered orally or parenterally do not include mechanisms for sustained release, and as a result they require higher and more frequent dosing to achieve any therapeutic effect for the patient. As a result, the field of drug delivery systems developed into a large focus area for pharmaceutical research to address these limitations and improve quality of care for patients. Within the broad field of drug delivery, the development of stimuli-responsive drug delivery systems has created the ability to tune drug delivery systems to achieve more controlled dosing and targeted specificity based on material response to exogenous and endogenous stimuli.

Endogenous stimuli consist of chemical, biological, and physical stimuli that occur naturally in the body, such as changes in pH, temperature, enzymatic action, pressure, and shear forces. More specifically, endogenous chemical stimuli include environmental pH, redox reactions, and chemical gradients, each of which are typically out of physiological range or unique to a specific or diseased tissue, which provides the ability to achieve target specificity using these particular stimuli for release. Researchers have worked to develop numerous types of drug delivery systems that harness a response to endogenous chemical stimuli to achieve targeted delivery and controlled release of drug into a specific environment. These chemically responsive drug delivery systems can be created using a wide variety of materials and carriers, including lipid, protein, or polymeric materials to create degradable scaffolds or depots and micelles and nanoparticles. An example of this includes the engineering of biopolymeric nanospheres that are triggered to release an encapsulated therapeutic when they enter the tumor microenvironment due to the drop in pH associated with the tumor microenvironment. Many of these systems rely on the application and manipulation of click chemistry to achieve stimulated response The field of endogenous chemical-responsive systems has developed greatly within the last 20 years and continues to grow as researchers determine new applications for the field, including the development of chemically responsive systems for diagnostic purposes.

== History ==
While the study of drug delivery methods and techniques has been around for centuries, the modern field of drug delivery we know today was not introduced until the 1960s, when the concept of controlled drug delivery systems was introduced by Judah Folkman, MD of Harvard. He first introduced the idea of a prolonged drug release system as a means of constant rate delivery while experimenting with anesthetic gases and arterio-venous shunts on mice This inspired the formation of a company called ALZA by a chemist named Alejandro Zaffaroni, whose primary focus was on the development of drug carrying systems that would increase the specificity and efficacy of drugs. The introduction of this concept led to the development of the field we know today, with macro scale delivery devices being developed in the 1970s and 1980s before moving into more focused development of microscale and nanoscale devices in the late 1980s onward. The concept of stimuli-responsive drug delivery systems can actually be seen as ahead of this time, since the first pH-responsive drug coating was used in the late 1950s in Europe. These coatings were used on drugs delivered to the stomach, so that they would protonate and dissolve at low pH to release drug. The development of stimuli-responsive drug carriers was not popularized until the mid-1980s by researchers at Utah University, who created thermally-responsive drug delivery systems. Since the eruption of this field, substantial research has been conducted to tune stimuli-responsive drug delivery systems despite several limitations. As of 2013, a redox-responsive therapy targeting metastatic breast cancer had been approved by the FDA but was not yet currently in use. Much work is still being done to continue the development of this field in hopes of one day making stimuli-responsive drug delivery systems commonplace in medical practice.

== Type of stimuli and their mechanisms of action ==
=== pH-responsive ===
pH responsive drug delivery systems respond to the environmental pH of a tissue, which, when existing within a certain acidic range, can lead to structural and chemical changes of the drug delivery system. These changes can include conformational changes and surface interactions that can lead to the degradation or swelling/shrinking of the drug carrier. pH responsive drug delivery systems are possible because of the tendency of diseased or cancerous tissues to maintain a lower pH value than is physiologically normal due to high rates of tumor cell metabolism (normal: 7.4, lower range: 5.0-6.5). These systems are governed by hydrophilic and hydrophobic interactions of self-assembled drug carriers within a certain pH range. These hydrophilic and hydrophobic interactions can cause the destabilization of these systems, which lead to conformational changes that cause the drug carrier to breakdown or degrade. As a result, the drug is released from the system. pH responsive drug delivery systems are typically synthesized from pH-responsive polymers that have been conjugated with ionic residues that change charge based on the pH of the environment. Systems used with pH-responsive polymers include implantable hydrogels and micro- and nanoparticles. pH-responsive drug delivery systems are particularly suitable for the design of chemotherapeutic delivery systems due to the naturally low pH found in tumor microenvironments, but can be applied in other disease settings where the pH of the varies from physiological pH. The highly targeted and controlled release ability, as well as their broad applications, make pH-responsive drug delivery systems some of the most well-researched and sought after clinical solutions in stimuli-responsive drug delivery.

=== Redox-responsive ===
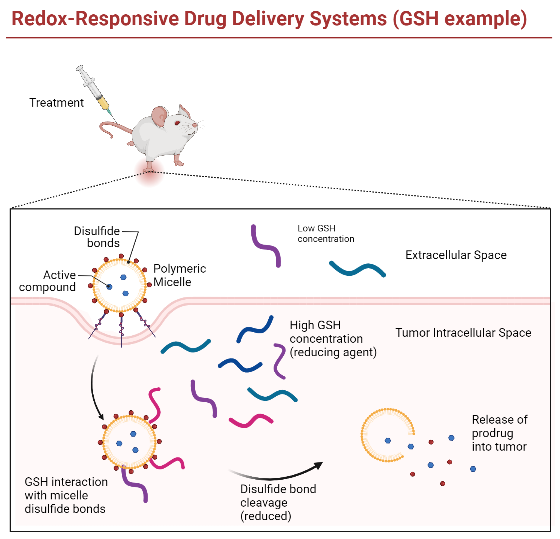
Example of intratumoral redox-responsive drug delivery

Redox responsive drug delivery systems rely on the natural reduction-oxidation reactions that occur in the body and the availability of reducing or oxidative-agents in the extracellular and intracellular space. In redox-stimulated responses, drug carriers enter the intracellular space through endocytosis and are destabilized by intracellular concentrations of reducing agents, leading to their disassembly and the delivery of the therapeutic intracellularly. For example, the use of redox stimulated drug delivery is primarily attributed to the high intracellular concentration of glutathione (GSH) as compared to the much lower extracellular concentration of GSH. GSH acts as a reducing agent in redox reactions, allowing it to cleave bonds like disulfide bonds. The increased level of GSH in tumor cells combined with its ability to cleave disulfide bonds has led to the development of drug delivery systems, such as polymeric micelles, synthesized with disulfide bonds that are subsequently cleaved by intracellular GSH, which cause the breakdown of the micelle and the intracellular release of the encapsulated therapeutic.

=== Gradient-responsive ===
Gradient responsive drug delivery systems are stimulated to deliver therapeutics through contact with an endogenous chemical gradient. When the system comes into contact with its specific chemical gradient, increased concentration of the chemical can lead to the conformational change or degradation of a drug carrier to allow drug release. Gradient responsive systems also include gradients created by pH or redox reactants.

== Applications ==
pH-responsive drug delivery systems are very popular subjects of research for their variability in application. Deviations from physiological pH occur in numerous disease states including infection, inflammation, and cancer, which makes this stimulus one of the most widely researched in the field of endogenous chemically responsive drug delivery systems. Applications of pH-responsive drug delivery systems include the synthesis of pH-responsive polymers into carriers like hydrogels, micelles, and micro- and nanovesicles. pH-responsive polymers can be selected for certain applications based on characteristics like the drug concentration, number of ionizable groups, and the type of carrier being used. Examples of widely used pH-responsive polymers include but are not limited to: poly(acrylamide), poly(acrylic acid), and poly(methacrylic acid)

Redox-responsive drug delivery systems are also widely studied for a variety of applications, in particular their use in targeting cancer due to the increased levels of GSH in cancerous cells. Redox-responsive drug delivery systems are also used in the delivery of DNA and siRNA for gene therapy. Redox-responsive drug carriers are primarily synthesized as micelles or polymersomes and are highly stable because they contain a high amount of cross-linking

Gradient-responsive drug delivery systems do not have a substantial body of research as of yet. The primary applications of gradient-responsive drug delivery systems are usually referenced as pH or redox gradients, as opposed to the gradients of other hormones or factors found naturally in the body. Aside from pH and redox gradients, there are no published works on gradient-responsive drug delivery systems.

Stimulus	Carrier	Therapeutic	Target	Status	Reference
Redox-Responsive	Antibody drug conjugate	Docetaxel	Metastatic breast cancer	Approved by FDA in 2013	
Redox-Responsive	Micelles	Doxorubicin	Cancer cells	Experimental	
Redox-Responsive	Micelles	Paclitaxel	Breast cancer	Experimental	
Redox-Responsive	Silica nanoparticles	Doxorubicin	Cancer cells	Experimental	
pH-Responsive	Nanovesicles	Paclitaxel	Metastatic lung cancer	Experimental	
pH-Responsive	Nanovesicles	Doxorubicin	Cancer cells	Experimental	
pH-Responsive	Micelleplex	Cisplatin prodrug	Tumors	Experimental	

== Limitations ==
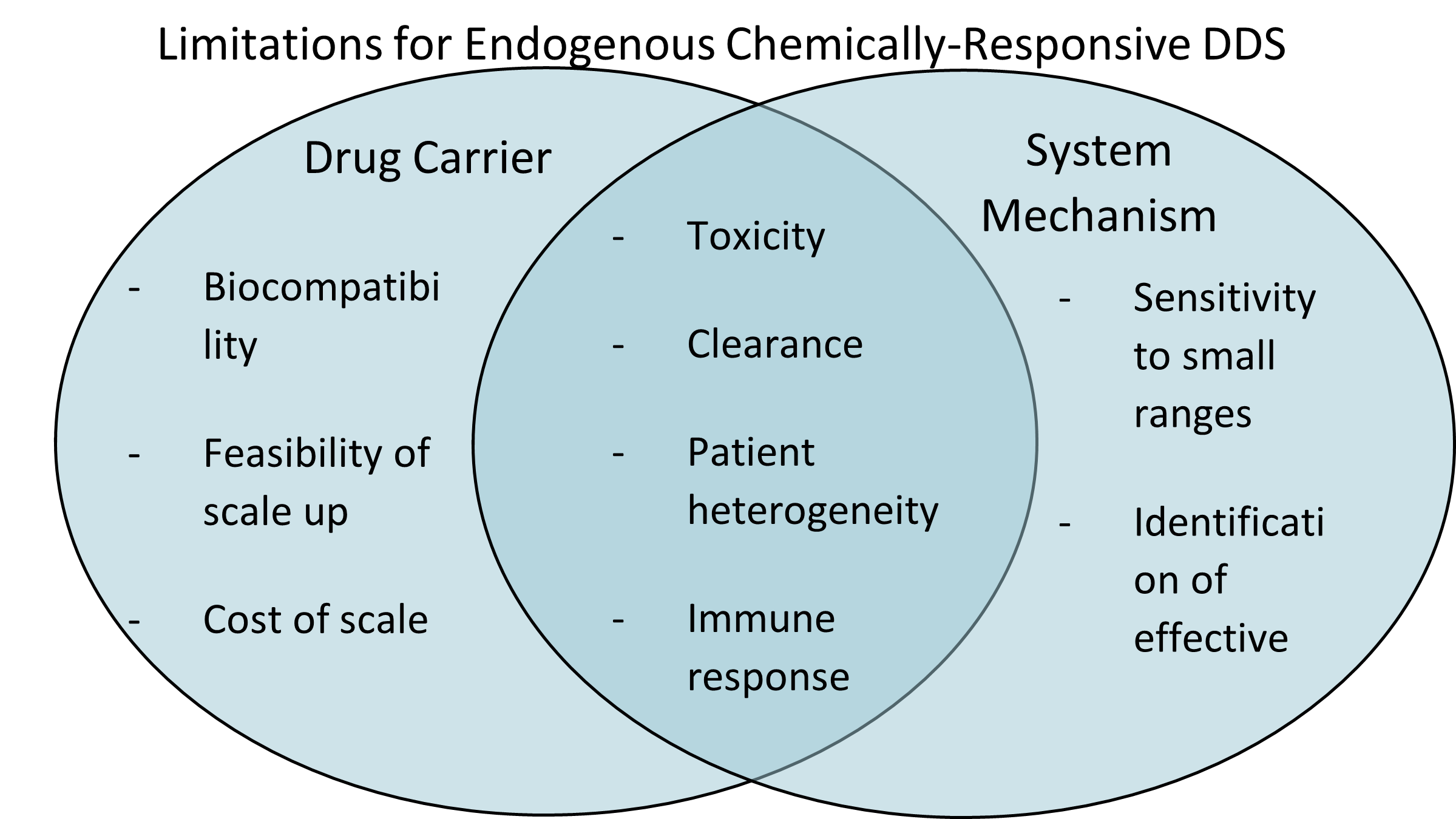
This Venn Diagram compares the limitations faced by endogenous chemically responsive drug delivery systems.

There are many limitations that exist within the field of endogenous chemically responsive drug delivery systems that prevent many of these products from approved to be used in a clinical setting. One of the primary challenges of endogenous chemically responsive drug delivery is the inability to address or overcome patient heterogeneity. Patient heterogeneity describes the naturally occurring difference between patient biology, such as differences in tumor pH for the same cancer and blood concentrations of redox reagents. The targeting of many chemical properties in pathological tissues is also restricted by a small range of fluctuation of the chemical property, which prevents researchers from being able to safely and specifically target that diseased tissue and stimulus due to small windows of sensitivity that have yet to be optimized. Other important limitations to consider include the formulation of the drug carrier, which can affect the clearance rate and biodistribution of the drug carrier and decrease therapeutic efficacy due to size, shape, or effective penetration of the tissue by the drug carrier. Biocompatibility and toxicity of the drug carrier formulation also poses a significant challenge to the development of the field, so future studies need to be conducted using inherently biocompatible materials to ensure feasibility and safety of these proposed delivery systems. Finally, cost of production and the scalability of the creation of stimuli responsive drug delivery systems remains an enormous barrier between the development and clinical use of these delivery systems.
