= Chemotactic drug-targeting =

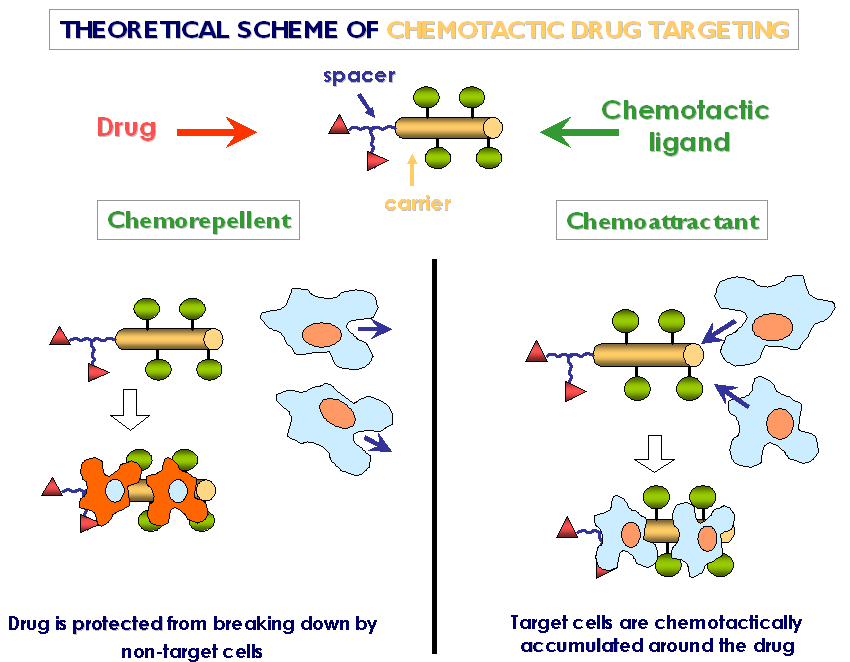
Chemotactic drug-targeting

Chemotactic drug-targeting is the science of engineering drug carriers which mimic natural chemotactic behavior and reduces systemic effects in specific environments or specific cells in the human body.
