= Asymmetric membrane capsule =

Drug delivery system

The asymmetric membrane capsule is an example of a single core osmotic delivery system, consisting of a drug-containing core surrounded by an asymmetric membrane made with a non disintegrating polymer (cellulose acetate, ethylcellulose etc.).
