= Enhanced permeability and retention effect =

Accumulation of molecules in tumor tissue

Enhanced permeability and retention (EPR) effect and passive targeting

The enhanced permeability and retention (EPR) effect is a controversial concept by which molecules of certain sizes (typically liposomes, nanoparticles, and macromolecular drugs) tend to accumulate in tumor tissue much more than they do in normal tissues. The general explanation that is given for this phenomenon is that, in order for tumor cells to grow quickly, they must stimulate the production of blood vessels. VEGF and other growth factors are involved in cancer angiogenesis. Tumor cell aggregates as small as 150–200 μm, start to become dependent on blood supply carried out by neovasculature for their nutritional and oxygen supply. These newly formed tumor vessels are usually abnormal in form and architecture. They are poorly aligned defective endothelial cells with wide fenestrations, lacking a smooth muscle layer, or innervation with a wider lumen, and impaired functional receptors for angiotensin II. Furthermore, tumor tissues usually lack effective lymphatic drainage. All of these factors lead to abnormal molecular and fluid transport dynamics, especially for macromolecular drugs. This phenomenon is referred to as the "enhanced permeability and retention (EPR) effect" of macromolecules and lipids in solid tumors. The EPR effect is further enhanced by many pathophysiological factors involved in enhancement of the extravasation of macromolecules in solid tumor tissues. For instance, bradykinin, nitric oxide / peroxynitrite, prostaglandins, vascular permeability factor (also known as vascular endothelial growth factor VEGF), tumor necrosis factor and others. One factor that leads to the increased retention is the lack of lymphatics around the tumor region which would filter out such particles under normal conditions.

The EPR effect is usually employed to describe nanoparticle and liposome delivery to cancer tissue. One of many examples is the work regarding thermal ablation with gold nanoparticles. Halas, West and coworkers have shown a possible complement to radiation and chemotherapy in cancer therapy, wherein once nanoparticles are at the cancer site they can be heated up in response to a skin penetrating near IR laser (Photothermal effect). This therapy has shown to work best in conjunction with chemotherapeutics or other cancer therapies. Although the EPR effect has been postulated to carry the nanoparticles and spread inside the cancer tissue, only a small percentage (0.7% median) of the total administered nanoparticle dose is usually able to reach a solid tumor.

== See also ==
- Hiroshi Maeda (chemist)
