= Drug delivery =

Methods for delivering drugs to target sites

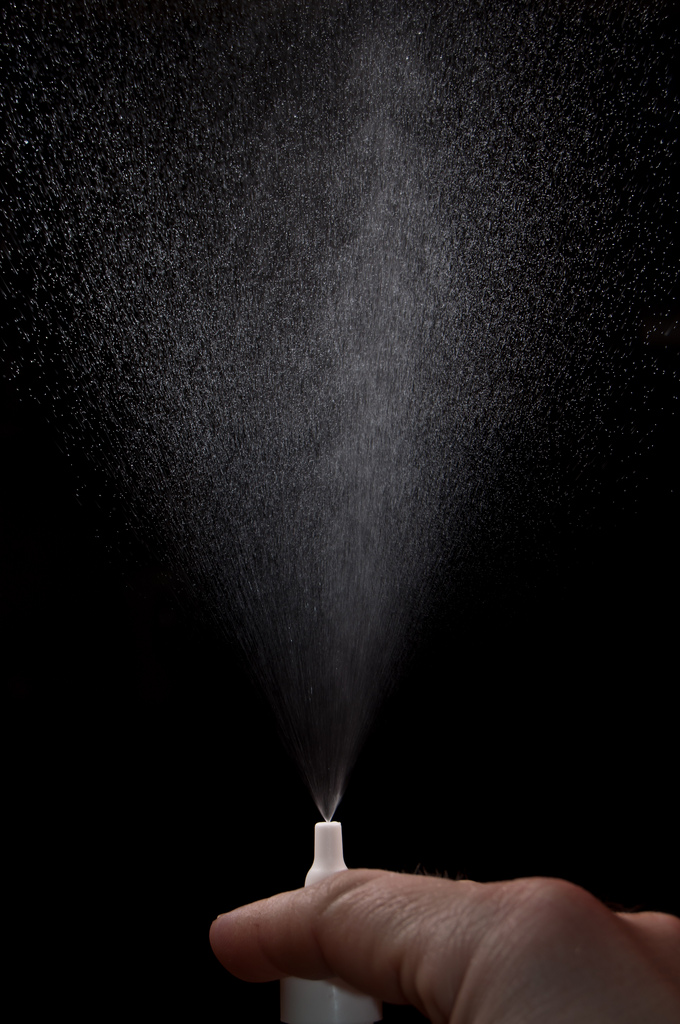
A nasal spray bottle being demonstrated.

Drug delivery involves various methods and technologies designed to transport pharmaceutical compounds to their target sites helping therapeutic effect. It involves principles related to drug preparation, route of administration, site-specific targeting, metabolism, and toxicity all aimed to optimize efficacy and safety, while improving patient convenience and compliance. A key goal of drug delivery is to modify a drug's pharmacokinetics and specificity by combining it with different excipients, drug carriers, and medical devices designed to control its distribution and activity in the body. Enhancing bioavailability and prolonging duration of action are essential strategies for improving therapeutic outcomes, particularly in chronic disease management. Additionally, some research emphasizes on improving safety for the individuals administering the medication. For example, microneedle patches have been developed for vaccines and drug delivery to minimize the risk of needlestick injuries.

Drug delivery is closely linked with dosage form and route of administration, the latter of which is sometimes considered to be part of the definition. Although the terms are often used interchangeably, they represent distinct concepts. The route of administration refers specifically to the path by which a drug enters the body, such as oral, parenteral, or transdermal. In contrast, the dosage form refers to the physical form in which the drug is manufactured and delivered, such as tablets, capsules, patches, inhalers or injectable solutions. These are various dosage forms and technologies which include but not limited to nanoparticles, liposomes, microneedles, and hydrogels that can be used to enhance therapeutic efficacy and safety. The same route can accommodate multiple dosage forms; for example, the oral route may involve tablet, capsule, or liquid suspension. While the transdermal route may use a patch, gel, or cream. Drug delivery incorporates both of these concepts while encompassing a broader scope, including the design and engineering of systems that operate within or across these routes. Common routes of administration include oral, parenteral (injected), sublingual, topical, transdermal, nasal, ocular, rectal, and vaginal. However, modern drug delivery continue to expand the possibilities of these routes through novel and hybrid approaches.

Since the approval of the first controlled-release formulation in the 1950s, research into new delivery systems has been progressing, as opposed to new drug development which has been declining. Several factors may be contributing to this shift in focus. One of the driving factors is the high cost of developing new drugs. A 2013 review found the cost of developing a delivery system was only 10% of the cost of developing a new pharmaceutical. A more recent study found the median cost of bringing a new drug to market was $985 million in 2020, but did not look at the cost of developing drug delivery systems. Other factors that have potentially influenced the increase in drug delivery system development may include the increasing prevalence of both chronic and infectious diseases, as well as a general increased understanding of the pharmacology, pharmacokinetics, and pharmacodynamics of many drugs.

== Current efforts ==
Current efforts in drug delivery are vast and include topics such as controlled-release formulations, targeted delivery, nanomedicine, drug carriers, 3D printing, and the delivery of biologic drugs.

=== The relation between nanomaterial and drug delivery ===
Nanotechnology is a broad field of research and development that deals with the manipulation of matter at the atomic or subatomic level. It is used in fields such as medicine, energy, aerospace engineering, and more. One of the applications of nanotechnology is in drug delivery. This is a process by which nanoparticles are used to carry and deliver drugs to a specific area in the body. There are several advantages of using nanotechnology for drug delivery, including precise targeting of specific cells, increased drug potency, and lowered toxicity to the cells that are targeted. Nanoparticles can also carry vaccines to cells that might be hard to reach with traditional delivery methods. However, there are some concerns with the use of nanoparticles for drug delivery. Some studies have shown that nanoparticles may contribute to the development of tumors in other parts of the body. There is also growing concern that nanoparticles may have harmful effects on the environment. Despite these potential drawbacks, the use of nanotechnology in drug delivery is still a promising area for future research.

=== Targeted delivery ===
Targeted drug delivery is the delivery of a drug to its target site without having an effect on other tissues. Interest in targeted drug delivery has grown drastically due to its potential implications in the treatment of cancers and other chronic diseases. In order to achieve efficient targeted delivery, the designed system must avoid the host's defense mechanisms and circulate to its intended site of action. A number of drug carriers have been studied to effectively target specific tissues, including liposomes, nanogels, and other nanotechnologies.

=== Microneedle Patches to Deliver Drugs ===
Drugs are delivered via scratch size patches known as Microneedle Patches. Microneedle patches are an invention of the introduction of drugs into the skin with the help of minute needles that are not painful. The patches can deliver vaccines or medications, including insulin to diabetes patients into the blood or skin (Reinke et al., 2024). They are easy to use and they could make people give treatments at home. However, such patches are very expensive and not easily accessible.

=== Controlled-release formulations ===
Controlled or modified-release formulations are designed to deliver medications at a steady rate over time, helping maintain consistent drug levels in the bloodstream. This steady release reduced how often patients need to take their medication and minimizes the ups and downs in drug concentration that can cause side effects or lower effectiveness. These systems often take the form of matrix tablets, osmotic pumps, and reservoir-type devices, all of which use physical or chemical barriers to regulate how the drug is released. This approach is especially useful for chronic conditions such as high blood pressure, diabetes, or chronic pain, where maintaining stable therapeutic levels is key to keeping symptoms under control.

The concept of controlled-release medication dates back to the 1950s, when Dexedrine became the first such formulation on the market. This era saw the introduction of transdermal patches, which deliver drugs slowly through the skin. As technology progressed, new formulations were developed to match the specific properties of different drugs. Examples include long-acting depot injections for medication like antipsychotics and hormone therapies, which remain effective for weeks or even months after a single dose.

Since the late 1990s, research has increasingly turned to nanotechnology as a way to improve controlled-released drug delivery. Nanoparticles, tiny carriers engineered at a molecular level, can protect drugs from being broken down too quickly in the body, improve how well they're absorbed, and deliver them directly to the tissues where they're needed. This targeted delivery not only reduces side effects but also helps patients stay on track with their treatments. These advances in nanotechnology are transforming the landscape of drug delivery and are emphasizing the importance of developing the next generation of CR systems.

=== Nanoparticle-based Controlled-Release ===
The use of nanotechnology into drug delivery has opened the door to new possibilities, particularly with the development of nanoparticle-based controlled-release systems. These systems are designed to deliver drugs more precisely and over longer periods of time helping with targeted sites and therapeutic effects. Tiny carriers, such as liposomes, dendrimers, and polymeric nanoparticles, can hold medication and release them at controlled rates. Some are even engineered to respond to specific conditions in the body. For instance, acidic microenvironment commonly found in tumor tissues can be used to trigger drug release at the site needed. This targeted approach helps minimize side effects by limiting exposure to the rest the body. Thus, making treatment more effective.

Recent studies have shown the effectiveness of smart nanoparticles that respond to biological cues, such as pH or redox conditions, thereby delivering drugs more precisely to tumor sites. For instance, pH-sensitive nanoparticles take advantage of the lower pH in tumor cells to release the drugs, which boost effectiveness while protecting healthy cells. Additionally, the use of biocompatible materials and switching the nanoparticle surfaces have improved their accuracy and release of delivery systems.

Advances in design have also made it possible to create multi-functional nanoparticles that are capable of handling tough challenges like multi-drug resistance in cancer. These systems can carry more than one type of drug, targeting specific molecules, which helps to deliver a stronger punch to tumor tissues. Altogether, these breakthroughs point to a potential for nanoparticle-based controlled-release therapies in the fields of cancer therapy and personalized medicine.

=== Advancements in Smart Polymers and Hydrogels ===
In recent years, advances in smart polymers and hydrogels have brought major improvements to how drugs are delivered in controlled-released systems. These materials are unique in that they can respond to changes inside the body, like shifts in pH, temperature, and glucose levels, making it possible to fine-tune when and how much of a drug is released. For example, some hydrogels are designed to expand or contract based on these internal signals, which helps regulate the speed of drug release. This kind of precision helps improves therapeutic treatment and reduces side effects. These responsive materials are useful for managing chronic condition like diabetes, where glucose-responsive hydrogels can adjust insulin release based on blood sugar levels.

=== Modulated drug release and zero-order drug release ===
Many scientists worked to create oral formulations that could maintain a constant drug level because of the ability of drug release at a zero-order rate blood's concentration. However, a few physiological restrictions made it challenging to create such oral formulations. First, because the lower parts of the intestine have a decreased capacity for absorption, the medication absorption typically declines as an oral formulation moves from the stomach to the intestine. The decreased drug amount released from the formulation over time frequently made this condition worse. Phenylpropanolamine HCl release from was the only instance of sustaining consistent blood concentration for roughly 16 hours.

=== Delivery of biologic drugs ===
Delivering biological drugs such as peptides, proteins, antibodies, and genetic material, comes with unique challenges. Because of their large size and electrical charges, these molecules are often poorly absorbed and easily broken down by enzymes in the body. To overcome these hurdles, scientists have been developing advanced delivery methods using tools like liposomes, nanoparticles, fusion proteins, and protein-based nanocages. Some strategies take inspiration from how toxins naturally enter cells by adapting those mechanisms for therapeutic use.

Among the macromolecules studied, RNA delivery has made progress, especially with the success of RNA-based COVID-19 vaccines. While protein and DNA delivery have shown progress, proteins in live animals and DNA in lab settings, delivering these large molecules, still remain a complex task. Although oral administration is generally preferred by patients for convenience, it's rarely effective for biologics due to poor absorption. That being said, innovative technologies such as enzyme inhibitors, permeation enhancers, lipid-based nanoparticles, and microneedles are being used to improve oral bioavailability for these drugs.

One of the recent developments that has been successful is the use of lipid nanoparticles (LNPs) to deliver messenger RNA (mRNA). LNPs protect fragile mRNA from degradation and escape from endosomes so it can reach the cytoplasm and produce proteins. This delivery method gained worldwide recognition during COVID-19 pandemic with the approval of mRNA vaccines from Pfizer-BioTech and Moderna. The rapid rollout of these vaccines proved that LNPs are not only effective but also scalable for mass production and global use.

Looking beyond vaccines, mRNA therapies are now being explored for a range of therapeutic applications including cancer immunotherapy, genetic disorders, and other infectious diseases. Researchers are also testing alternative delivery systems, like exosomes and new types of nanoparticles, to make mRNA therapies safer and more efficient. However, challenges remain, as mRNA is highly sensitive to environmental conditions. To address this, ongoing research is expanding into new administration routes including inhalable or oral mNRA formulations. This could reduce production costs and make these therapies more accessible to the world.

=== Nanoparticle drug delivery ===
Delivering medications to the brain has long been a significant challenge in treating neurological diseases. The main reason lies in the blood-brain barrier (BBB), a highly selective, protective layer that shields the brain from toxins and pathogens in the bloodstream. While the BBB is crucial for maintaining brain health, it also makes it difficult for most therapeutic drugs to reach their target, especially in conditions like Alzheimer's and Parkinson's disease. As a result, conventional drug delivery methods often fall short, either causing unwanted side effects or failing to deliver a high enough concentration to be effective.

To address this, researchers have turned to nanoparticles, tiny engineered carriers designed to sneak past the BBB and deliver drugs directly to the brain tissue These particles can be tailored to take advantage of the body's own transport systems. For example, by attaching certain molecules to their surfaces, nanoparticles can trigger receptor-mediated transcytosis, a natural process that allows them to pass through cells lining the BBB and enter the brain. This kind of targeted delivery helps reduce the drug's exposure to the rest of the body, lowering the risk of side effects and increasing concentration where it matters most. So far, this strategy has shown promise in delivering treatments to the brain for conditions like Alzheimer's and Parkinson's disease.

Several types of nanoparticles are being studied for this purpose. Liposomes, for instance, are small vesicles that can carry drugs and be modified to circulate longer or home in on specific brain regions. Dendrimers, with their tree-like structure, can hold multiple drug molecules and targeting agents at once. Polymeric nanoparticles, made from biodegradable materials like polylactic acid (PLA) or polylactic-co-glycolic acid (PLGA), can be engineered to release drugs over time in a controlled way. Solid lipid nanoparticles offer another alternative, combining biocompatibility with the ability to cross barriers more efficiently. Altogether, these advances are paving the way for more effective and precise treatments for a range of neurological disorders.

Nanotechnology helps to transfer medicine to specific places in the body. Drug delivery in new forms with the assistance of minute particles, like liposomes or polymeric micelles. These particles support the drugs by preventing disintegration and enhancing functionality (Islam et al., 2025). An example would be, they can distribute cancer drugs to the tumors, which reduce the side effects. Researchers also come up with particles, which release drugs when going through certain conditions like heat or light. Despite the nature of this technology, it remains expensive and needs further safety studies. In the near future researchers say there will be a more advanced strategies of treatment such as the use nanomedicine and technology like artificial intelligence (Islam et al., 2025).

Drug Delivery: Developing Countries

The drug delivery mechanisms have the potential to enhance the health of all parts of the world despite the fact that most of the advanced systems are quite costly to the poor nations. Simple system, orals or skin patch, is more feasible in low resource countries. Most countries have used vaccines that are administered orally to combat such diseases as polio (Yenet et al., 2023). The government and the hospital organizations need to collaborate in order to reduce the cost and offer the new means of drug distribution that will allow giving the new medications everywhere.

Ethical and Safety Issues

Emerging drug delivery devices such as nanoparticles or gene therapies are highly dangerous in terms of safety and equity. For example, we should make sure that the treatments would not negatively affect the environment or cause any incidental side effects. The regulation of other agencies such as FDA are applied in the process of ensuring the safety of new practices but vary across countries (World Health Organization, 2024). The government has the mandate of making sure that medicine is not only affordable to the wealthy members of the society, but also to the vulnerable ones as well.

The issue of drug delivery has raised a number of ethical concerns with respect to patients and healthcare systems. One common concern is the accessibility of specific medications within a health organization. Advanced delivery systems such as gene therapies, nanoparticles, or implants have been costly, and therefore, only patients within wealthy countries can afford them. This indicates that healthcare no longer considers equality and fairness. Another ethical concern is the issue of privacy. Digital tools have been used to determine and track patient medical adherence. Although these tools may help improve patient welfare, they may also be used to expose patient data, and there are increasing insecurities regarding patients' personal information.

== See also ==
- Acoustic targeted drug delivery
- Asymmetric membrane capsule
- Bioavailability
- Bovine submaxillary mucin coatings
- Chemotactic drug-targeting
- Drug delivery to the brain
- Drug carrier
- Gated drug delivery systems
- Magnetic drug delivery
- Neural drug delivery systems
- Retrometabolic drug design
- Self-microemulsifying drug delivery system
- Stretch-triggered drug delivery
- Thin film drug delivery
- Aptamer
