= Moein Moghimi =

British chemist

Academic background
- Education: University of Manchester (BSc): Charing Cross Hospital Medical School (PhD)

Academic work
- Discipline: Biochemistry, nanotechnology
- Sub-discipline: Drug delivery Nanomedicine; Nanosafety; Innate immunity and complement system Pharmaceutical nanotechnology Pharmaceutical sciences
- Institutions: Newcastle University

Moein Moghimi is a British professor and researcher in the fields of nanomedicine, drug delivery and biomaterials. He is currently the professor of Pharmaceutics and Nanomedicine at the School of Pharmacy and the Translational and Clinical Research Institute at Newcastle University. He is also an adjoint professor at the Skaggs School of Pharmacy, University of Colorado Denver.

He is known for his fundamental and translational research in nanomedicine and drug delivery, especially in polymeric and nanomaterials' cell and immune safety, and as an inventor of nanosystems for tissue-specific targeting.

Moghimi's publications in nanomedicine are widely cited. A study conducted by Stanford University listed Moghimi among the top 0.1% of world's leading scientists across in all fields. He founded the Centre for Pharmaceutical Nanotechnology and Nanotoxicology (CPNN) at University of Copenhagen and was its director until 2016. He co-founded S. M. Discovery Group which develops products based on his inventions. He is currently editor-in-chief of the Journal of Nanotheranostics.

== Early life and education ==
Moghimi completed his secondary education at D'Overbroeck's College in Oxford, United Kingdom. He pursued a bachelor's degree in biochemistry at the University of Manchester and graduated with honors in 1985. He completed his PhD in liposome immunobiology/biochemistry in 1989 at the Biochemistry Department of the Charing Cross Hospital Medical School at Imperial College London (then University of London) under the mentorship of Harish M. Patel.

He then joined Stanley Stewart Davis' laboratory at the Department of Pharmaceutical Sciences, University of Nottingham for postdoctoral training in advanced drug delivery system engineering. Later he became a University Research Fellow at University of Nottingham.

== Academic career ==
Moghimi was the senior lecturer of Biopharmacy and Molecular Pharmaceutics at the School of Pharmacy, University of Brighton from 1998 until 2008. From 2008 until 2010, he was honorary professor of nanomedicine at the Multidisciplinary Research Center, Shantou University.

He was also a full affiliate professor at the Methodist Research Institute, Houston Methodist Hospital systems in Texas between 2013 and 2017.

From 2008 until 2016, he was professor of nanomedicine in the department of pharmacy and professor of pharmaceutical nanotechnology at the Nanoscience Center, as well as the founder and director of the Centre for Pharmaceutical Nanotechnology and Nanotoxiocology at the University of Copenhagen.

Prior to 2017, Moghimi was professor and chair in pharmaceutics at the Durham University School of Medicine, Pharmacy and Health. Since 2017, he has been professor of Pharmaceutics and Nanomedicine at the School of Pharmacy and Translational and Clinical Research Institute, both part of Newcastle University. He is adjoint professor at the department of pharmaceutical sciences at Skaggs School of Pharmacy, University of Colorado Denver Medical Center.

== Editorial activities ==
Moghimi is Editor-in-Chief of the Journal of Nanotheranostics and Drug Delivery. He is associate editor of Precision Nanomedicine, Molecular Therapy, and serves on the editorial boards of journals such as Advanced Drug Delivery Reviews, Journal of Controlled Release, and Nanomedicine-UK.

== Research ==
Moghimi is known for his work in nanoparticle engineering for biomedical applications, nanosafety, and mechanistic understanding of nanoparticle-mediated complement activation. His research focuses on interdisciplinary approaches to nanotherapies. Much of his research is related to the management and treatment of chronic conditions associated with population ageing including cancer, neurological disorders such as Parkinson's disease and Alzheimer's disease, cardiovascular disease, allergies and arthritis. He specializes in the design and surface engineering of nanosystems and nanoparticles for tissue-specific drug delivery and imaging.

His current work includes the development of a concomitant long-term computational network assessment of genomics and epigenomic factors in inter-individual variations to nanomedicine performance and cell re-programming.

Resulting from his PhD research, Moghimi introduced the opsonin-dysopsonin hypothesis, suggesting a regulatory role for certain blood proteins in limiting nanoparticle uptake by macrophages. This hypothesis was later applied to highlight multifaceted mechanisms regulating the pharmacokinetic performance of long-circulating drug carriers.

Moghimi has developed a range of injectable nanosystems, including an early prototype of splenotropic and lymphotropic nanoparticles based on the concept of steric stabilisation and surface engineering with block copolymers. These concepts are applied for splenic and lymphatic targeting with liposomes and polymeric nanospheres.

A research group led by Moghimi developed NanoLigand Carriers, induced self-assemblies of phage-derived display peptides that on intravenous injection rapidly target two receptors on the blood brain-barrier. On crossing the blood–brain barrier, the carriers target neurons and microglia and deliver their therapeutic nucleic acid payloads to cells. These peptides have applications for the treatment of neurodegenerative disorders.

His laboratory was among the first to explain polycation-mediated cell death processes. Moghimi's laboratory has contributed to the molecular understanding of nanomaterial interactions with elements of the innate immune system and translating these to design immune safe nanoparticles. His laboratory demonstrated the first in vivo assembly of long-circulating and splenotropic nanoparticles without prior surface modification or manipulation of macrophage function, as well as the first demonstration of the detection of stealth nanoparticles by primed and activated immune cells.

This research has involved mapping nanoparticle properties that trigger complement activation and, notably, the role of polymer conformation and hydration in switching complement activation pathways. He has resolved some challenging mechanisms modulating complement activation by stealth and polymer-coated nanoparticles. His research also explained the molecular basis of complement activation by polyethylene glycol, a polymer that is used widely for prolonging the blood circulation time of proteins and particulate drug carriers.

His lab was the first to demonstrate tumour growth promotion by stealth nanoparticles through local nanoparticle-mediated complement activation, and developed the first complement-evading hexosomes.

He has challenged the validity of the CARPA (Complement Activation Related Pseudo-Allergy) hypothesis, and proposed a working mechanism explaining idiosyncratic nanomedicine-mediated anaphylaxis seen in patients. Moghimi also introduced the nanomaterial projected "Angstrom-Scale Spacing Arrangement" hypothesis, in modulating complement system responses to nanomedicines and medical implants.

In 2020, Moghimi commented on the sudden closure of the Centers of Cancer Nanotechnology Excellence in the United States, and called for support in curiosity driven research in fundamental nanomedicine even in the absence of immediate obvious benefits to society.

== Selected bibliography ==
- "Nanomedicine: Shadow and substance". Handbook of Clinical Nanomedicine (2nd ed.). Pan Stanford Publishing. 2016. ISBN 978-981-4669-22-1.. With Fahrangrazi, Shadi.
- "Particle Nanoengineering for the Lymphatic System and Lymph Node Targeting". Polymer-Based Nanostructures: Medical Applications. RCS Nanoscience and Nanotechnology Series. Royal Society of Chemistry. 2010. ISBN 978-0-85404-956-1.

== Selected articles ==
- Wibroe, Peter Popp; Anselmo, Aaron C.; Nilsson, Per H.; Sarode, Apoorva; Gupta, Vivek; Urbanics, Rudolf; Szebeni, Janos; Hunter, Alan Christy; Mitragotri, Samir; Mollnes, Tom Eirik; Moghimi, Seyed Moein (June 2017). "Bypassing adverse injection reactions to nanoparticles through shape modification and attachment to erythrocytes". Nature Nanotechnology. 12 (6): 589–594. Bibcode:2017NatNa..12..589W. doi:10.1038/nnano.2017.47. hdl:10037/13642. ISSN 1748-3395. PMID 28396605.
- Chen, Fangfang; Wang, Guankui; Griffin, James I.; Brenneman, Barbara; Banda, Nirmal K.; Holers, V. Michael; Backos, Donald S.; Wu, Linping; Moghimi, Seyed Moein; Simberg, Dmitri (April 2017). "Complement proteins bind to nanoparticle protein corona and undergo dynamic exchange in vivo". Nature Nanotechnology. 12 (4): 387–393. Bibcode:2017NatNa..12..387C. doi:10.1038/nnano.2016.269. ISSN 1748-3395. PMC 5617637. PMID 27992410.
- Moghimi, S. M.; Hunter, A. C.; Murray, J. C. (June 2001). "Long-circulating and target-specific nanoparticles: theory to practice". Pharmacological Reviews. 53 (2): 283–318. doi:10.1016/S0031-6997(24)01494-7. PMID 11356986.
- Moghimi, S. M.; Hunter, A. C.; Murray, J. C. (2005). "Nanomedicine: current status and future prospects". FASEB Journal. 19 (3): 311–330. doi:10.1096/fj.04-2747rev. PMID 15746175. S2CID 30173777.
- Moghimi, S. M.; Symonds, P.; Murray, J. C.; Hunter, A. C.; Debska, G.; Szewczyk, A. (2005). "A two-stage poly(ethylenimine)-mediated cytotoxicity: implications for gene transfer/therapy". Molecular Therapy. 11 (6): 990–995. doi:10.1016/j.ymthe.2005.02.010. PMID 15922971.
- Hamad, I.; Hunter, A.C.; Szebeni, J.; Moghimi, S.M. (December 2008). "Poly(ethylene glycol)s generate complement activation products in human serum through increased alternative pathway turnover and a MASP-2-dependent process". Molecular Immunology. 46 (2): 225–232. doi:10.1016/j.molimm.2008.08.276. PMID 18849076.
- Hamad, Islam; Al-Hanbali, Othman; Hunter, A. Christy; Rutt, Kenneth J.; Andresen, Thomas L.; Moghimi, S. Moein (23 November 2010). "Distinct Polymer Architecture Mediates Switching of Complement Activation Pathways at the Nanosphere−Serum Interface: Implications for Stealth Nanoparticle Engineering" (PDF). ACS Nano. 4 (11): 6629–6638. doi:10.1021/nn101990a. PMID 21028845.
- Wu, Lin-Ping; Ahmadvand, Davoud; Su, Junan; Hall, Arnaldur; Tan, Xiaolong; Farhangrazi, Z. Shadi; Moghimi, S. Moein (2019). "Crossing the blood-brain-barrier with nanoligand drug carriers self-assembled from a phage display peptide". Nature Communications. 10 (1): 4635. Bibcode:2019NatCo..10.4635W. doi:10.1038/s41467-019-12554-2. PMC 6789111. PMID 31604928.
- Wu, L. P.; Ficker, M.; Christensen, J. B.; Simberg, D.; Trohopoulos, P. N.; Moghimi, S. M. (2021). "Dendrimer end-terminal motif-dependent evasion of human complement and complement activation through IgM hitchhiking". Nature Communications. 12 (1): 4858. Bibcode:2021NatCo..12.4858W. doi:10.1038/s41467-021-24960-6. PMC 8357934. PMID 34381048.
