= Lajos Balogh (scientist) =

Hungarian-American scientist

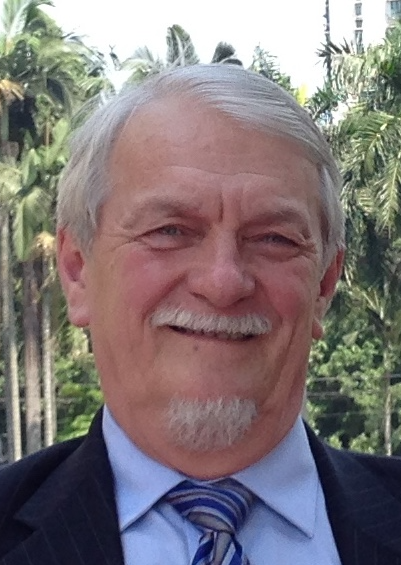
- Born: January 15, 1950 (age 76); Komádi, Hajdú-Bihar, Hungary
- Citizenship: Hungarian-American
- Education: Ph.D., Kossuth Lajos University of the Sciences and the Art
- Alma mater: KLTE, Debrecen, Hungary
- Occupations: Scientist, Editor
- Known for: Polymer chemistry, dendrimers, and nanomedicine
- Website: precisionnanomedicine.com

Lajos Peter Balogh (born January 15, 1950), mainly referred to as Lou Balogh, is a Hungarian-American scientist known for his research on polymers, dendrimer nanocomposites, and nanomedicine. Balogh is the editor-in-chief of Precision Nanomedicine (PRNANO). Based on his career-long citation numbers, he belongs to the World's Top 2% Scientists.

== Early life and education ==
Balogh was born on January 15, 1950, in Komádi, Hajdú-Bihar County, Hungary. He studied chemistry at the Debreceni Vegyipari Technikum then at the Kossuth Lajos University from 1969 to 1974, earning his Ph.D. in 1983. In 1991, Balogh received an invitation from the University of Massachusetts Lowell and moved to the United States.

== Career ==
Balogh joined UMass Lowell as a visiting professor in 1991. In 1996, he left for the Michigan Molecular Institute to research dendrimers, where he was a senior associate scientist in Donald Tomalia's group. From 1998 to 2018, Balogh worked as a professor at the University of Michigan Ann Arbor, Center for Biologic Nanotechnology, the University at Buffalo, and co-directed Nano-Biotechnology Center at the Roswell Park Comprehensive Cancer Center. As a visiting professor, he also taught at the Chinese Academy of Sciences, the Seoul National University, and the Semmelweis University.

Balogh is one of the co-founders of the American Society for Nanomedicine (2008). He has been a board member of several expert organizations, e.g., the U.S. Technical Advisory Group to ISO TC229 on Nanotechnology (since 2005), the Scientific Committee of the CLINAM Summits (since 2011), and numerous other National and International Steering Committees.

He has also taught abroad as a visiting professor, holding a visiting professorship for senior international scientists at the Chinese Academy of Sciences in Beijing, an award of the Korean Federation of Science and Technology Societies Brain Pool programme at Seoul National University, and a Fulbright teaching and research scholarship at Semmelweis University.

Between 2008 and 2016, Balogh was editor-in-chief of scientific journal Nanomedicine: Nanotechnology, Biology, and Medicine, published by Elsevier. In 2017, Balogh initiated Manuscript Clinic, a platform that helped scientists and students publish their research results in nanomedicine and nanotechnology. In 2018, he founded Andover House, Inc., a not-for-profit online publishing company, and launched Precision Nanomedicine (PRNANO). He serves as the editor-in-chief of this journal, whish is official journal of the International Society for Nanomedicine and of CLINAM, the European Society for Clinical Nanomedicine, based in Basel, Switzerland.

== Personal life ==
Balogh is married to Éva Kovács Balogh, a Hungarian American linguist. He has three children, Andrea, Péter, and Áki. Peter Balogh was the crew chief of the University of Michigan Solar car team's MomentUM, which won first place at the North American Solar Challenge in 2005 and now works in the maritime industry in Asia.

== Research work ==
Balogh discovered and pioneered dendrimer nanocomposites, drug delivery platforms, and co-invented new cancer treatments. He is considered an international expert in nanomedicine and scholarly publications. He published 228 scientific papers in chemistry, physics, nanotechnology, and nanomedicine, gave over 230 invited lectures, and was awarded 12 patents. His publications have been cited over 10000 times (22 papers with more than 100 citations, 11 with more than 200 citations, and 2 cited over 1000 times; h-index=42). Balogh has been listed as belonging to the World's top 2% of Scientists.

== Selected publications ==
=== Peer-reviewed publications ===
- Wolfgang Parak, Beatriz Pelaz, Christoph Alexiou, Ramon A. Alvarez-Puebla, Frauke Alves, Anne M. Andrews, Sumaira Ashraf, Lajos P. Balogh, et al., Diverse Applications of Nanomedicine, ACS Nano. ACS Nano, 2017, 11 (3), pp 2313–2381, DOI: 10.1021/acsnano.6b0604
- Kukowska-Latallo, Jolanta F. Kimberly A. Candido, Zhengyi Cao, Shraddha S. Nigavekar, Istvan J Majoros, Thommey P. Thomas, Lajos P. Balogh, Mohamed K. Khan and James R. Baker, Jr., Nanoparticle Targeting of Anticancer Drug Improves Therapeutic Response in Animal Model of Human Epithelial Cancer, Cancer Research 2005, 65, 5317-5324
- L. Balogh and Donald A. Tomalia: Poly(Amidoamine) Dendrimer-Templated Nanocomposites I. Synthesis of Zero-Valent Copper Nanoclusters; Journal of Am. Chem. Soc., 1998, 120, 7355-7356
- L Balogh, R Valluzzi, KS Laverdure, SP Gido, GL Hagnauer, DA Tomalia: Formation of silver and gold dendrimer nanocomposites, Journal of Nanoparticle Research 1, 353-368
- Lajos P. Balogh, Shawn M. Redmond, Peter Balogh, Houxiang Tang, David C. Martin, Stephen C. Rand: "Self-Assembly and Optical Properties of Dendrimer Nanocomposite Multilayers," Macromolecular Bioscience 2007, 7, 1032–1046
- Yuliang Zhao, Lajos Balogh, Caging Cancer, Nanomedicine: Nanotechnology, Biology, and Medicine, 11 (2015) 867–869
- Hong, S. A. U. Bielinska, A. Mecke, B. Keszler, J. L. Beals, X. Shi, L. Balogh, B. G. Orr, J. R. Baker Jr., and M. M. Banaszak Holl, Interaction of Poly(amidoamine) Dendrimers with Supported Lipid Bilayers and Cells: Hole Formation and the Relation to Transport, Bioconj. Chem. 2004, 15, 774-782
- L Balogh, DR Swanson, DA Tomalia, GL Hagnauer, AT McManus, Dendrimer−silver complexes and nanocomposites as antimicrobial agents, Nano letters 1 (1), 18-21

=== Books ===
- Lajos P. Balogh (Ed), Nanomedicine's Most Cited Series, Vol.2, Nano-Enabled Medical Applications (Taylor & Francis, 2020)
- Lajos P. Balogh (Ed), Nanomedicine's Most Cited Series, Vol.1, Nanomedicine in Cancer (Taylor & Francis, 2017)

=== Book chapters ===
- Lajos P. Balogh, "Introduction to Nanomedicine" Chapter 1 in Nanomedicine in Health And Disease, Ed: Victor R. Preedy, Science Publishers, 2011, p.3.
- Lajos P. Balogh, Donald A. Mager and Mohamed K. Khan, "Synthesis and Biodisposition of Dendrimer Composite Nanoparticles," Chapter 6 in: Materials for Nanomedicine, Eds: V. Torchilin and M. Amiji, World Scientific Publishing, 2010
- Lajos P. Balogh, Teyeb Ould Ely, and Wojciech G. Lesniak "Composite Nanoparticles for Cancer Imaging and Therapy: Engineering Surface, Composition, and Shape," Chapter 4 in Nanomedicine Design of Particles, Sensors, Motors, Implants, Robots, and Devices, Eds: M. Schulz, V.N. Shanov, ISBN 978-1-59693-279-1, Artech House 2009
- Lajos P. Balogh, "Dendrimer 101" Chapter 11 (p 136-155) in: "Biological and Biomedical Applications of Engineered Nanostructures" Ed: Warren P. Chan – U. Toronto, Eurekah, 2007.
- Lajos P Balogh and Mohamed K Khan: Dendrimer Nanocomposites for Cancer Therapy" Chapter 28 (p. 551–592, in Nanotechnology in Cancer Therapy (Ed: Mansour Amiji), CRC Press (Taylor and Francis Group), Boca Raton, London, New York, 2006

=== Selected patents ===
- J. Y. Ye, T. B. Norris, L. P. Balogh, J. R. Baker, Jr., Laser-based Method and System for Enhancing Optical Breakdown, US 7,474,919 B2, January 6, 2009
- D. A. Tomalia and L. Balogh: "Nanocomposites of Dendritic Polymers" US 6,664,315 B2, December 16, 2003
- D. A. Tomalia and L. Balogh: "Method and Articles for Transfection of Genetic Material," US 6,475,994, November 5, 2002,
- L. Balogh, D. R. Swanson, D. A. Tomalia, G. L. Hagnauer, A. T. McManus: "Antimicrobial Dendrimer Nanocomposites and a Method of Treating Wounds," US 6,224,898 B1, May 1, 2001.
- R. Faust and L. Balogh: U.S. 5,665,837 (1997); Initiation via Haloboration in Living Cationic Polymerization
