= Metallodendrimer =

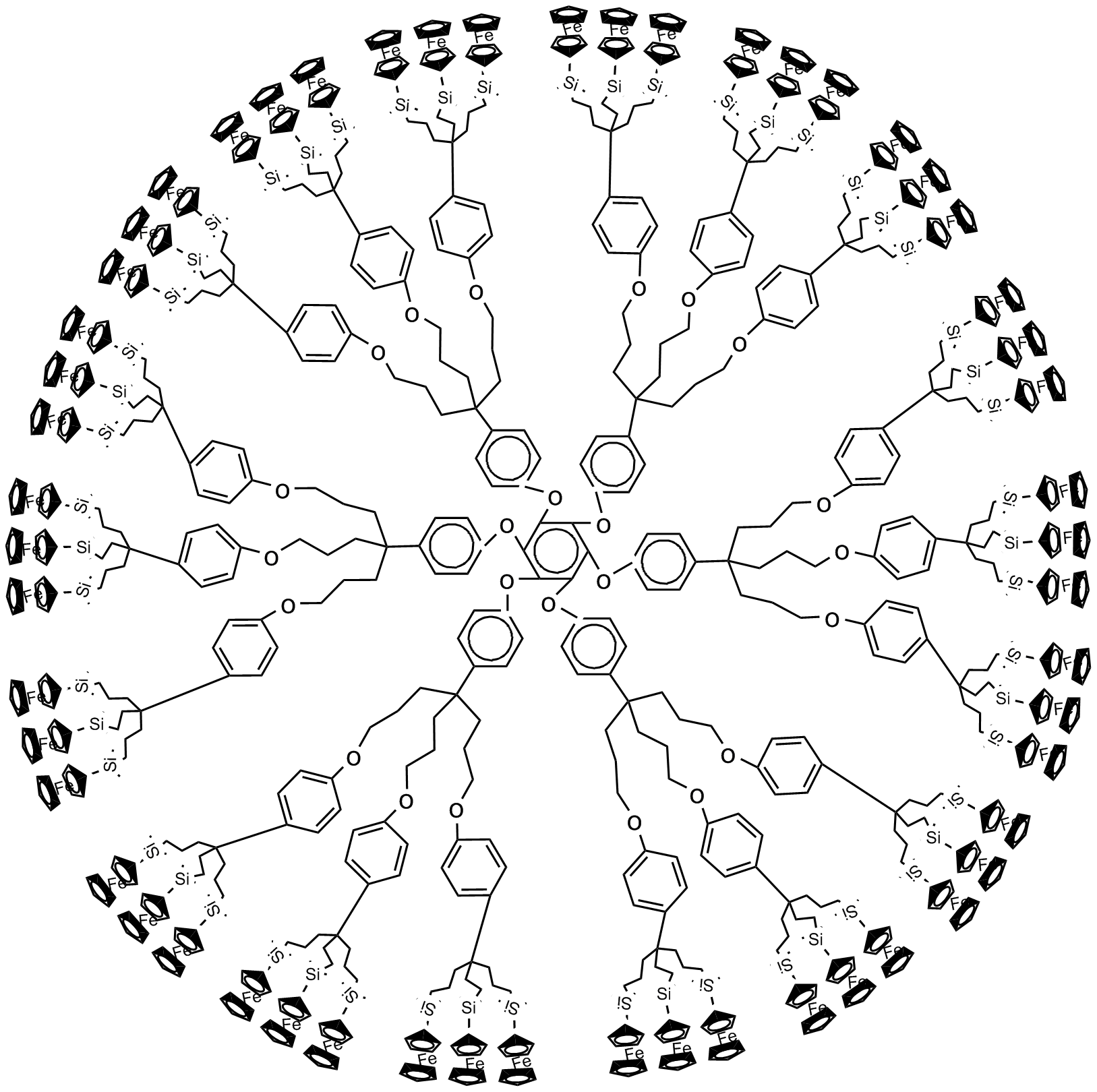
Dendrimer containing ferrocene

A metallodendrimer is a type of dendrimer with incorporated metal atoms. The development of this type of material is actively pursued in academia.

== Structure ==
The metal can be situated in the repeat unit, the core or at the extremities as end-group. Elements often encountered are palladium and platinum. These metals can form octahedral six-coordinate M(IV) linking units from organic dihalides and the corresponding 4-coordinate M(II) monomers. Ferrocene-containing dendrimers and dendrimers with cobaltocene and arylchromiumtricarbonyl units have been reported in end-functional dendrimers.

Metallodendrimers can form as metal complexes with dendritic counter ions for example by hydrolysis of ester terminated PAMAM dendrimers with sodium hydroxide.

== Applications ==
Metallodendrimers are investigated as equivalents to nanoparticles. Applications can be expected in the fields of catalysis, as chemical sensors in molecular recognition - for example of bromine and chloride anions - or as materials capable of binding metals. Metallodendrimers can also mimic certain biomolecules for example haemoprotein in dendrimer with a porphyrin core. Further uses are reported as electrocatalyst.

Examples of metallodendrimer heterogeneous catalysis are a nickel-containing dendrimer active in the Kharasch addition, palladium-containing dendrimers active in ethylene polymerization and in the Heck reaction.
