= Stracher =

Stracher is a surname. Notable people with the surname include:

- Alfred Stracher (1931–2013), American biochemist
- Glenn Stracher, namesake of Stracherite
