= PG5 =

Largest stable synthetic molecule ever made

PG5 is the largest stable synthetic molecule ever made up to 2010. PG5 is a dendrimer designed by the organic chemistry research group working at the Federal Institute of Technology in Zürich.

== Properties ==
PG5 has a molecular mass of about 200 MDa or 200,000,000 grams (200,000 kg)/mol. It has roughly 17 million atoms and a diameter of about 10 nm. Its length is up to a few micrometers. It is similar in size to a tobacco mosaic virus with comparable length and diameter. PG5 was shown to be resistant against attempts to flatten its structure, and it is one of the heaviest compounds in the world.

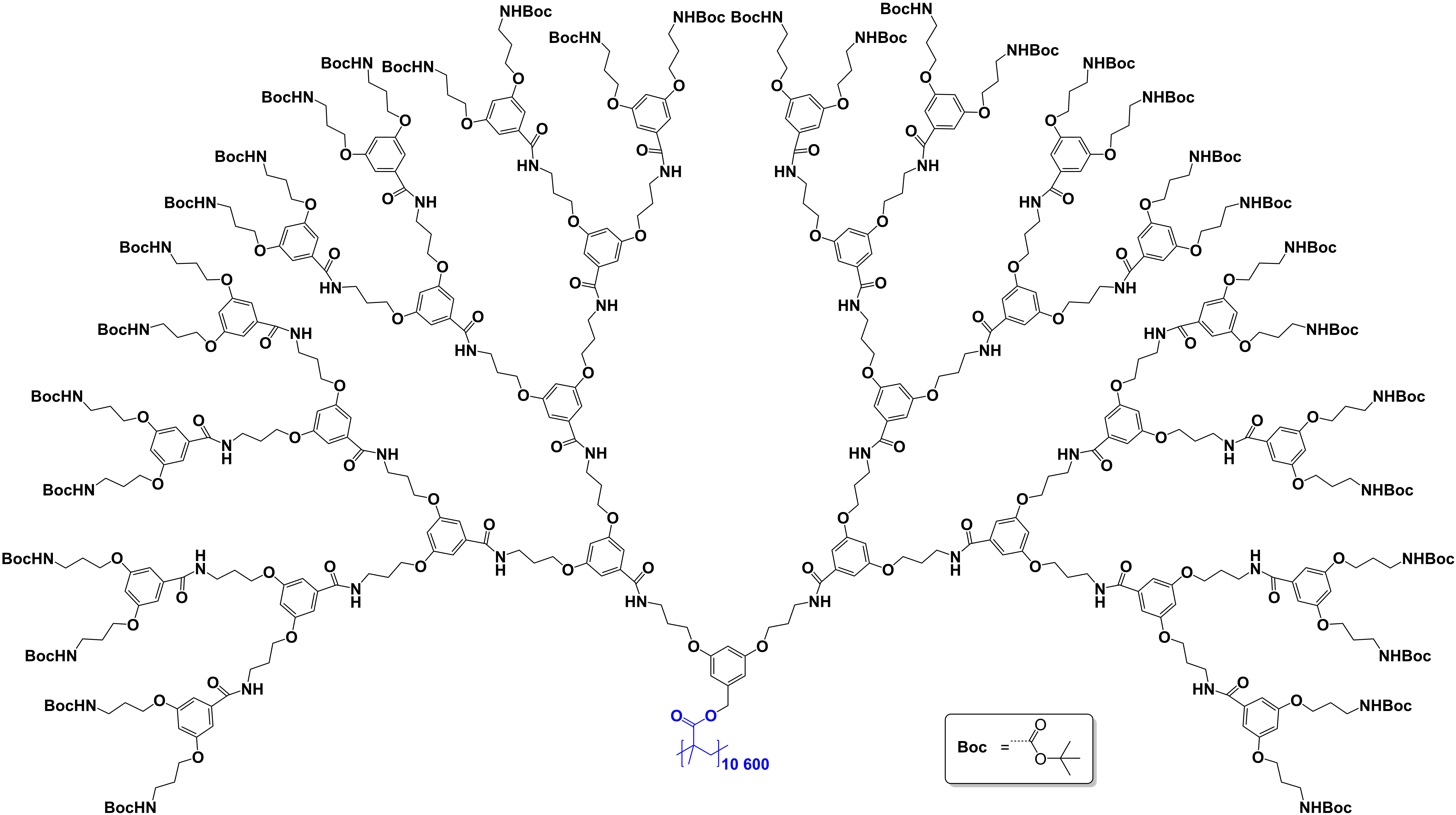
Structure of PG5
