= Polymer Factory Sweden AB =

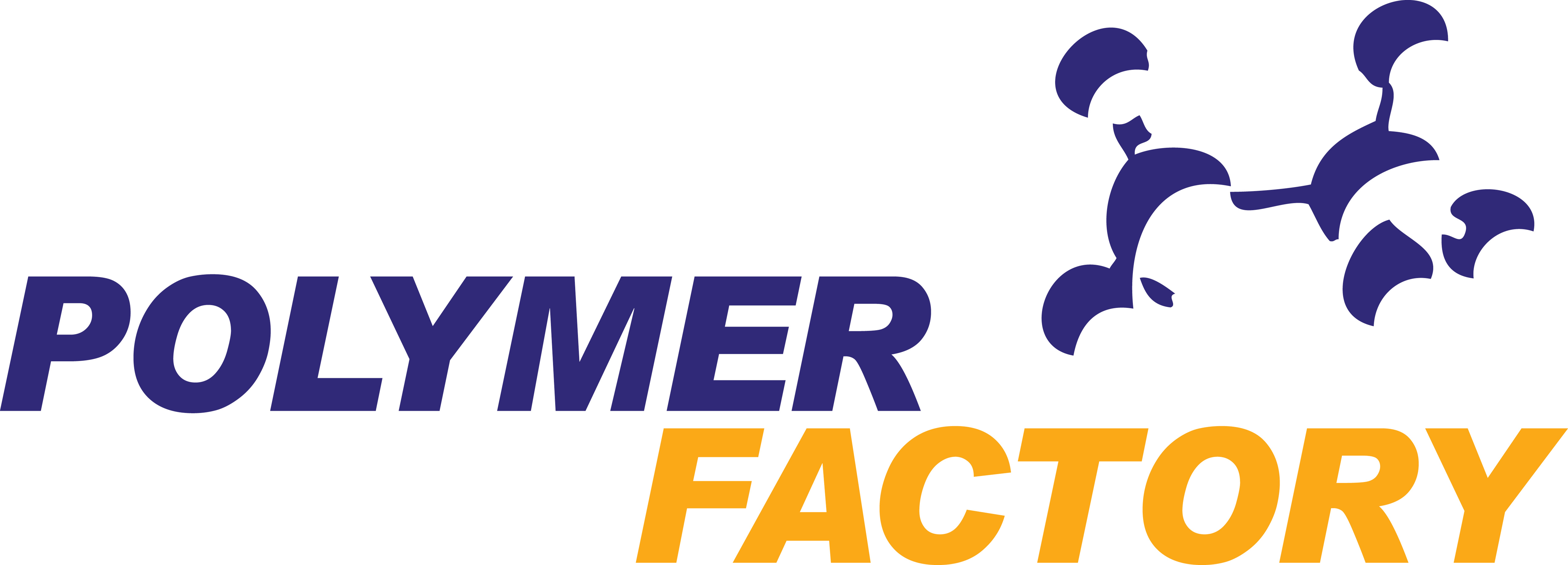

Info
- Type: Private Limited
- Industry: Research and Development
- Founded: 2005
- Headquarters: Stockholm, Sweden
- Products: Dendrimers, Dendrons, Contract Research
- Employees: 4-6 employees
- Website: http://www.polymerfactory.com

Established in 2005, Polymer Factory concentrates on developing well defined dendrimers and dendron based on 2,2-bis(methylol)propionic acid, where the company has the exclusive right to the production, marketing, and sales of such materials. The company also provides tailor-made hyperbranched polymers. Polymer Factory's research lab is located in Stockholm, Sweden.

The company supports research and development projects in a broad array of applications, ranging from Nanotechnology, Medicine, Photonic Application, Catalysis, Click chemistry, MALDI-TOF Calibrants, Thiol-ene Click and semiconductor materials.

Polymer Factory was founded in 2005.

== See also ==
- Polymer
- Dendrimer
