= Dendrimer =

Highly ordered, branched polymeric molecule

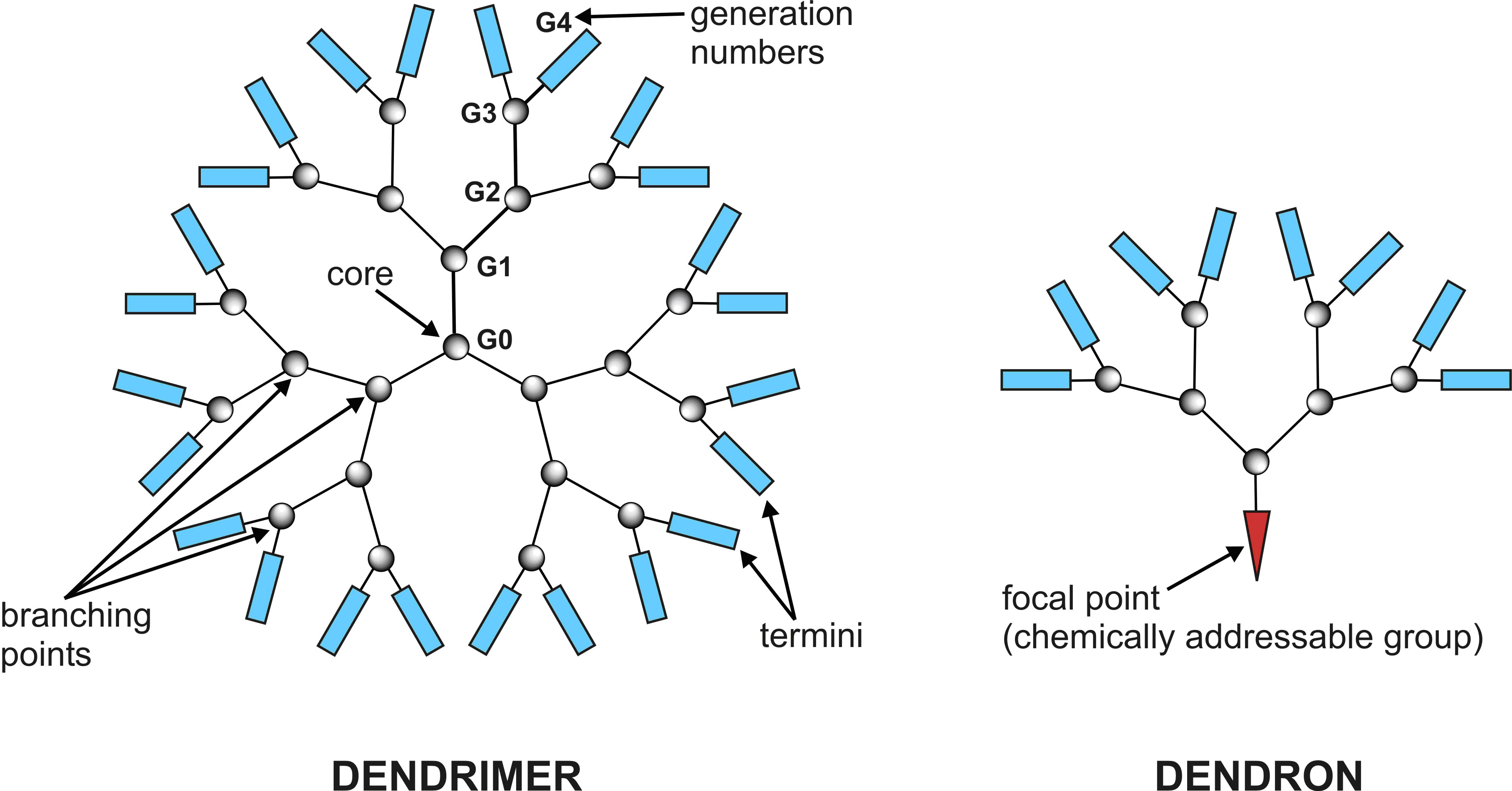
Dendrimer and dendron

Dendrimers are highly ordered, branched polymeric molecules. Synonymous terms for dendrimer include arborols and cascade molecules. Typically, dendrimers are symmetric about the core, and often adopt a spherical three-dimensional morphology. The word dendron is also encountered frequently. A dendron usually contains a single chemically addressable group called the focal point or core. The difference between dendrons and dendrimers is illustrated in the top figure, but the terms are typically encountered interchangeably.

IUPAC definition

Dendrimer Substance composed of identical dendrimer molecules.

Dendrimer molecule

Molecule consisting of one or more dendrons emanating from a single constitutional unit.

Dendron

Part of a molecule with only one free valence, comprising exclusively dendritic and terminal constitutional repeating units and in which each path from the free valence to any end-group comprises the same number of constitutional repeating units. Note 1: For the purpose of determining the nature of constitutional repeating units the free valence is treated as a connection to a CRU. Note 2: A dendrimer molecule comprising only one dendron is sometimes referred to as dendron, monodendron or functionalised dendron. The use of the terms 'dendron' or 'monodendron' in the meaning of molecule or substance is not acceptable. Note 3: In a dendron, macrocycles of constitutional units are absent.

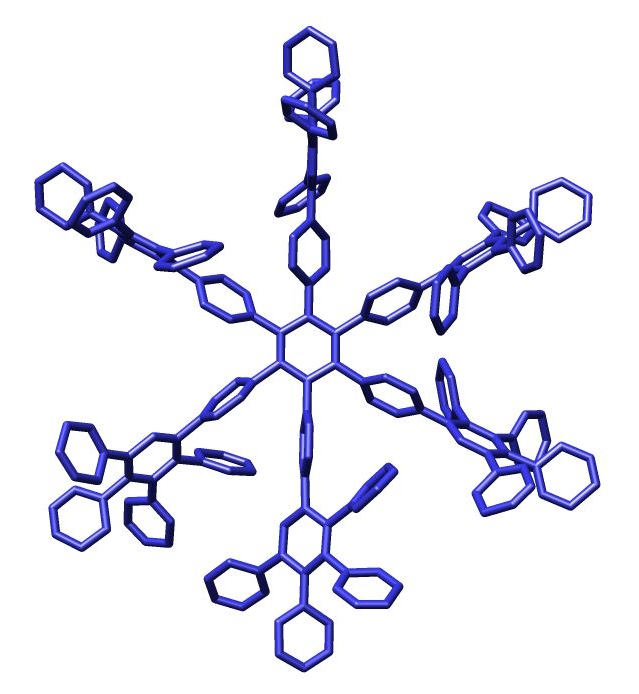
Crystal structure of a first-generation polyphenylene dendrimer, consisting of interlocked, twisted phenyl rings.

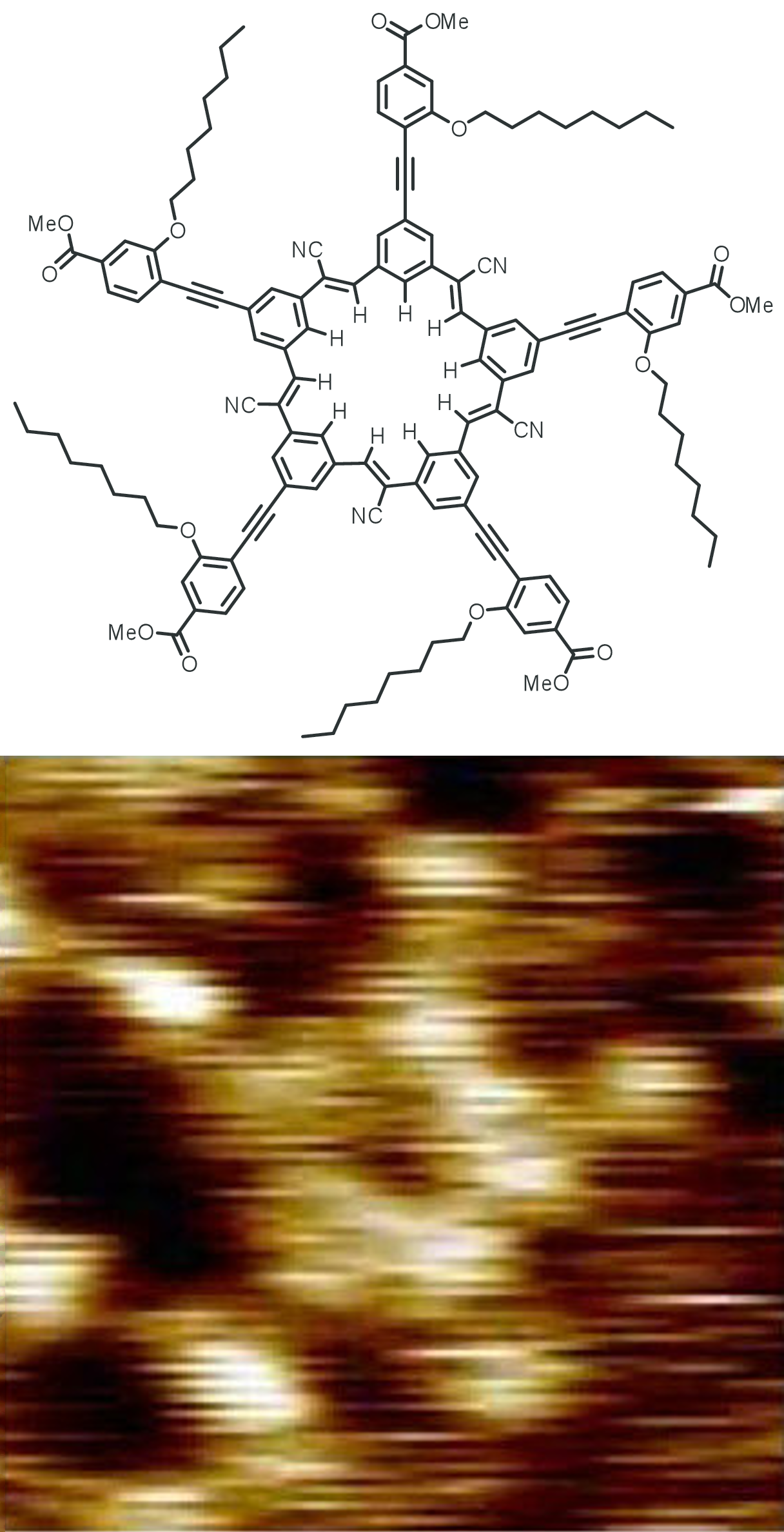
Chemical structure and STM image of cyanostar CS-2, a first-generation dendrimer. It is a macrocycle with fivefold rotation symmetry (C5). It self-assembles on graphite as a flat layer consisting of lines in alternating directions (antiparallel).

The first dendrimers were made by divergent synthesis approaches by Fritz Vögtle in 1978, R.G. Denkewalter at Allied Corporation in 1981, Donald Tomalia at Dow Chemical in 1983 and in 1985, and by George R. Newkome in 1985. In 1990 a convergent synthetic approach was introduced by Craig Hawker and Jean Fréchet. Dendrimer popularity then greatly increased, resulting in more than 5,000 scientific papers and patents by the year 2005.

== Etymology ==
The name comes from two Greek words: "dendron" meaning 'tree' and "meros" meaning 'part'.

== Properties ==
Dendritic molecules are characterized by structural perfection. Dendrimers and dendrons are monodisperse and usually highly symmetric, spherical compounds. The field of dendritic molecules can be roughly divided into low-molecular weight and high-molecular weight species. The first category includes dendrimers and dendrons, and the latter includes dendronized polymers, hyperbranched polymers, and the polymer brush.

A hyperbranched polymer is similar to a dendrimer, but more randomly structured. A hyperbranched polymer has a number of randomly distributed linear constitutional repeating units.

The properties of dendrimers are dominated by the functional groups on the molecular surface. Dendrimers may have a single surface functional group, or may be modified to allow for multiple functional groups on the surface. But some dendrimers have functional groups inside, not on the surface. Dendritic encapsulation of functional molecules allows for the isolation of the active site, a structure that mimics that of active sites in biomaterials. Also, it is possible to make dendrimers water-soluble, unlike most polymers, by functionalizing their outer shell with charged species or other hydrophilic groups. Other controllable properties of dendrimers include toxicity, crystallinity, tecto-dendrimer formation, and chirality.

=== Generation ===
In a dendrimer, the monomers are arranged in generations. The monomers in the "core" are generation 0, written as G0. The monomers attached to G0 are generation 1, written as G1, etc. A dendrimer is called a "first-generation dendrimer" if it has monomers of G0 and G1, but not G2. Similarly for "second-generation dendrimer" and so on.

In general, an n-th generation dendrimer is synthesized by n repeated branching cycles. For example, if a dendrimer is made by convergent synthesis, and the branching reactions are performed onto the core molecule three times, the resulting dendrimer is a third-generation dendrimer.

Each successive generation results in a dendrimer roughly twice the molecular weight of the previous generation. Higher generation dendrimers also have more exposed functional groups on the surface, which can later be used to customize the dendrimer for a given application.

== Synthesis ==
A dendrimer has three major components: a core, an inner shell, and an outer shell. Ideally, an experimenter can design a synthesis process, to obtain a dendrimer with different designated functionalities in each of these portions. This allows the experimenter to finely control properties of the final dendrimer, such as solubility, thermal stability, and attachment of compounds for particular applications. The experimenter can also design the synthesis processes to precisely control the size and number of branches on the dendrimer.

There are two defined methods of dendrimer synthesis, divergent synthesis and convergent synthesis. However, because the actual reactions consist of many steps needed to protect the active site, it is difficult to synthesize dendrimers using either method. This makes dendrimers hard to make and very expensive to purchase.

=== Divergent methods ===
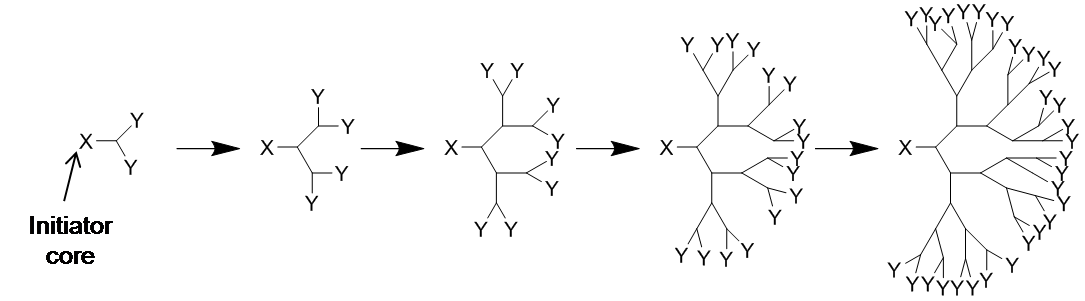
Schematic of divergent synthesis of dendrimers

The dendrimer is assembled from a multifunctional core, which is extended outward by a series of reactions, commonly a Michael reaction. Each step of the reaction must be driven to full completion to prevent mistakes in the dendrimer, which can cause trailing generations (some branches are shorter than the others). Such impurities can impact the functionality and symmetry of the dendrimer, but are extremely difficult to purify out because the relative size difference between perfect and imperfect dendrimers is very small.

=== Convergent methods ===
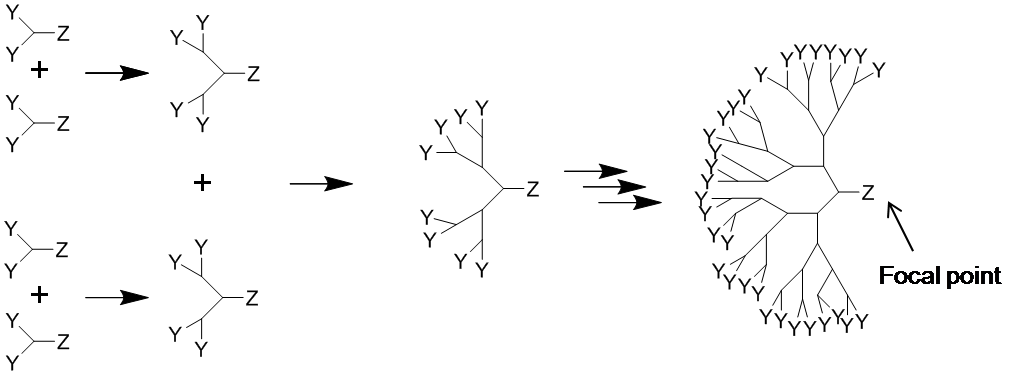
Schematic of convergent synthesis of dendrimers

Dendrimers are built from small molecules that end up at the surface of the sphere, and reactions proceed inward building inward and are eventually attached to a core. This method makes it much easier to remove impurities and shorter branches along the way, so that the final dendrimer is more monodisperse. However dendrimers made this way are not as large as those made by divergent methods because crowding due to steric effects along the core is limiting.

=== Click chemistry ===
Dendrimer Diels-Alder reaction.

Dendrimers have been prepared via click chemistry, employing Diels-Alder reactions, thiol-ene and thiol-yne reactions and azide-alkyne reactions.

There are ample avenues that can be opened by exploring this chemistry in dendrimer synthesis.

=== Examples ===
==== Arborol ====
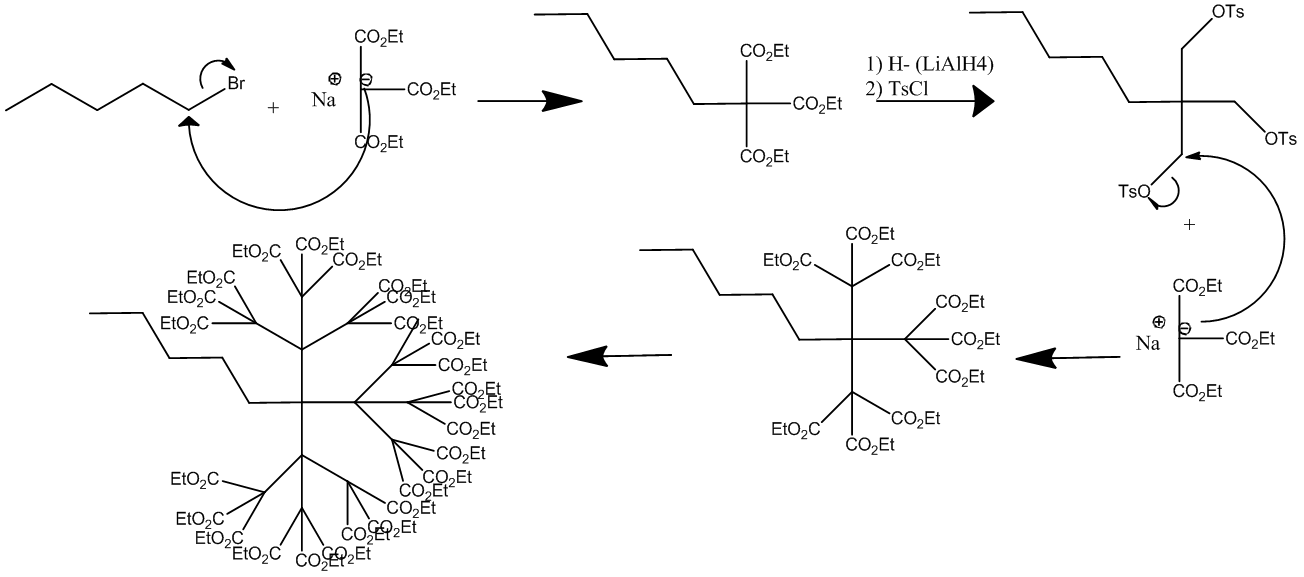
Synthesis to second generation arborol

One of the first dendrimers, the Newkome dendrimer, was synthesized in 1985. This macromolecule is also commonly known by the name arborol. The figure outlines the mechanism of the first two generations of arborol through a divergent route (discussed below). The synthesis is started by nucleophilic substitution of 1-bromopentane by triethyl sodiomethanetricarboxylate in dimethylformamide and benzene. The ester groups were then reduced by lithium aluminium hydride to a triol in a deprotection step. Activation of the chain ends was achieved by converting the alcohol groups to tosylate groups with tosyl chloride and pyridine. The tosyl group then served as leaving groups in another reaction with the tricarboxylate, forming generation two. Further repetition of the two steps leads to higher generations of arborol.

==== PAMAM ====
Poly(amidoamine), or PAMAM, is perhaps the most well known dendrimer. The core of PAMAM is a diamine (commonly ethylenediamine), which is reacted with methyl acrylate, and then another ethylenediamine to make the generation-0 (G-0) PAMAM. Successive reactions create higher generations, which tend to have different properties. Lower generations can be thought of as flexible molecules with no appreciable inner regions, while medium-sized (G-3 or G-4) do have internal space that is essentially separated from the outer shell of the dendrimer. Very large (G-7 and greater) dendrimers can be thought of more like solid particles with very dense surfaces due to the structure of their outer shell. The functional group on the surface of PAMAM dendrimers is ideal for click chemistry, which gives rise to many potential applications.

== Commercial supply ==
Dendrimer synthesis is still difficult and expensive. At this time, there are only a few companies that sell dendrimers; Polymer Factory Sweden AB commercializes biocompatible bis-MPA dendrimers and Dendritech is the only kilogram-scale producers of PAMAM dendrimers. NanoSynthons, LLC from Mount Pleasant, Michigan, USA produces PAMAM dendrimers and other proprietary dendrimers.

== Applications ==
Applications of dendrimers typically involve conjugating other chemical species to the dendrimer surface that can function as detecting agents (such as a dye molecule), affinity ligands, targeting components, radioligands, imaging agents, or pharmaceutically active compounds. Dendrimers have very strong potential for these applications because their structure can lead to multivalent systems. In other words, one dendrimer molecule has hundreds of possible sites to couple to an active species. Researchers aimed to utilize the hydrophobic environments of the dendritic media to conduct photochemical reactions that generate the products that are synthetically challenged. Carboxylic acid and phenol-terminated water-soluble dendrimers were synthesized to establish their utility in drug delivery as well as conducting chemical reactions in their interiors. This might allow researchers to attach both targeting molecules and drug molecules to the same dendrimer, which could reduce negative side effects of medications on healthy cells.

Dendrimers can also be used as a solubilizing agent. Since their introduction in the mid-1980s, this novel class of dendrimer architecture has been a prime candidate for host–guest chemistry. Dendrimers with hydrophobic core and hydrophilic periphery have shown to exhibit micelle-like behavior and have container properties in solution. The use of dendrimers as unimolecular micelles was proposed by Newkome in 1985. This analogy highlighted the utility of dendrimers as solubilizing agents. The majority of drugs available in pharmaceutical industry are hydrophobic in nature and this property in particular creates major formulation problems. This drawback of drugs can be ameliorated by dendrimeric scaffolding, which can be used to encapsulate as well as to solubilize the drugs because of the capability of such scaffolds to participate in extensive hydrogen bonding with water. Dendrimer labs are trying to manipulate dendrimer's solubilizing trait, to explore dendrimers for drug delivery and to target specific carriers.

For dendrimers to be able to be used in pharmaceutical applications, they must surmount the required regulatory hurdles to reach market. One dendrimer scaffold designed to achieve this is the polyethoxyethylglycinamide (PEE-G) dendrimer. This dendrimer scaffold has been designed and shown to have high HPLC purity, stability, aqueous solubility and low inherent toxicity.

=== Drug delivery ===
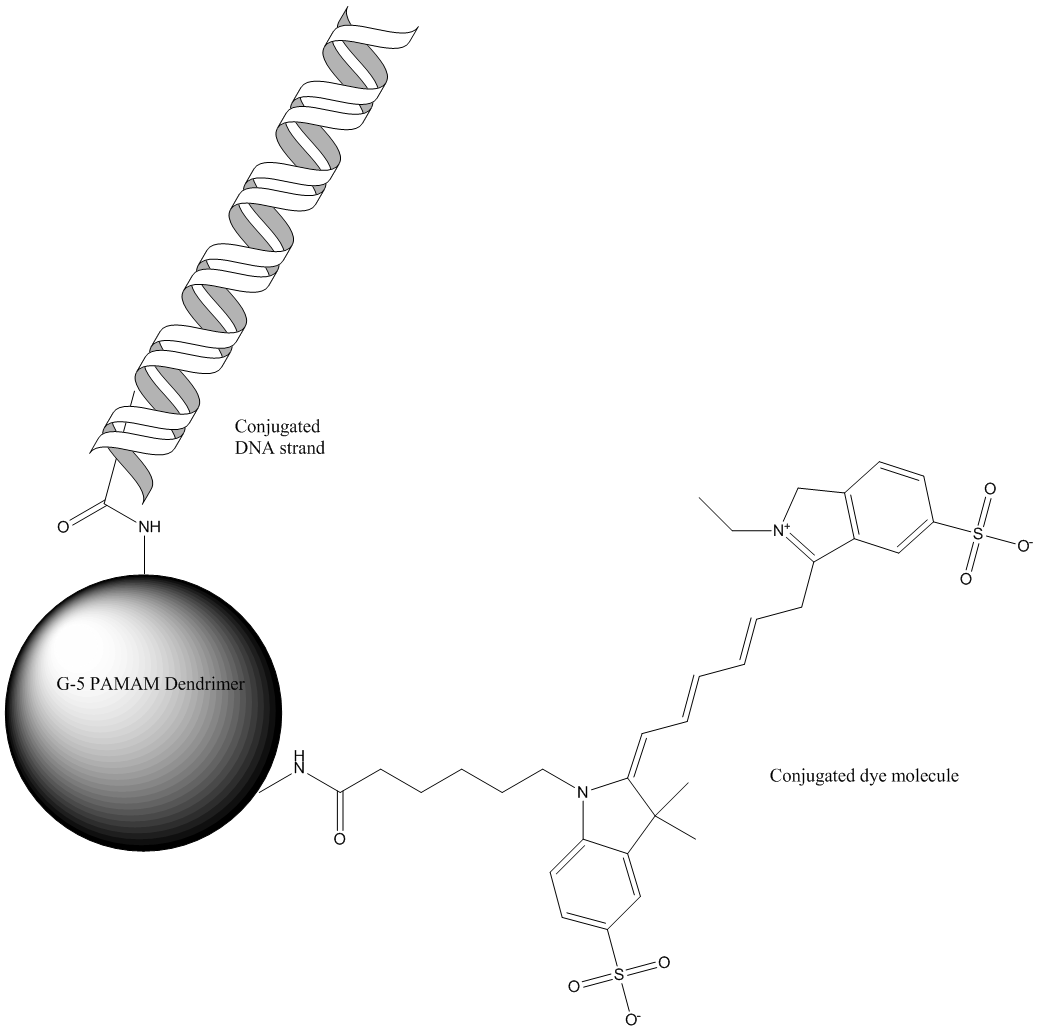
Scheme of a G-5 PAMAM dendrimer conjugated to both a dye molecule and a strand of DNA.

Approaches for delivering unaltered natural products using polymeric carriers is of widespread interest. Dendrimers have been explored for the encapsulation of hydrophobic compounds and for the delivery of anticancer drugs. The physical characteristics of dendrimers, including their monodispersity, water solubility, encapsulation ability, and large number of functionalizable peripheral groups make these macromolecules appropriate candidates for drug delivery vehicles.

==== Role of dendrimer chemical modifications in drug delivery ====
Dendrimers are particularly versatile drug delivery devices due to the wide range of chemical modifications that can be made to increase in vivo suitability and allow for site-specific targeted drug delivery.

Drug attachment to the dendrimer may be accomplished by (1) a covalent attachment or conjugation to the external surface of the dendrimer forming a dendrimer prodrug, (2) ionic coordination to charged outer functional groups, or (3) micelle-like encapsulation of a drug via a dendrimer-drug supramolecular assembly. In the case of a dendrimer prodrug structure, linking of a drug to a dendrimer may be direct or linker-mediated depending on desired release kinetics. Such a linker may be pH-sensitive, enzyme catalyzed, or a disulfide bridge. The wide range of terminal functional groups available for dendrimers allows for many different types of linker chemistries, providing yet another tunable component on the system. Key parameters to consider for linker chemistry are (1) release mechanism upon arrival to the target site, whether that be within the cell or in a certain organ system, (2) drug-dendrimer spacing so as to prevent lipophilic drugs from folding into the dendrimer, and (3) linker degradability and post-release trace modifications on drugs.

Polyethylene glycol (PEG) is a common modification for dendrimers to modify their surface charge and circulation time. Surface charge can influence the interactions of dendrimers with biological systems, such as amine-terminal modified dendrimers which have a propensity to interact with cell membranes with anionic charge. Certain in vivo studies have shown polycationic dendrimers to be cytotoxic through membrane permeabilization, a phenomenon that could be partially mitigated via addition of PEGylation caps on amine groups, resulting in lower cytotoxicity and lower red blood cell hemolysis. Additionally, studies have found that PEGylation of dendrimers results in higher drug loading, slower drug release, longer circulation times in vivo, and lower toxicity in comparison to counterparts without PEG modifications.

Numerous targeting moieties have been used to modify dendrimer biodistribution and allow for targeting to specific organs. For example, folate receptors are overexpressed in tumor cells and are therefore promising targets for localized drug delivery of chemotherapeutics. Folic acid conjugation to PAMAM dendrimers has been shown to increase targeting and decrease off-target toxicity while maintaining on-target cytotoxicity of chemotherapeutics such as methotrexate, in mouse models of cancer.

Antibody-mediated targeting of dendrimers to cell targets has also shown promise for targeted drug delivery. As epidermal growth factor receptors (EGFRs) are often overexpressed in brain tumors, EGFRs are a convenient target for site-specific drug delivery. The delivery of boron to cancerous cells is important for effective neutron capture therapy, a cancer treatment which requires a large concentration of boron in cancerous cells and a low concentration in healthy cells. A boronated dendrimer conjugated with a monoclonal antibody drug that targets EGFRs was used in rats to successfully deliver boron to cancerous cells.

Modifying nanoparticle dendrimers with peptides has also been successful for targeted destruction of colorectal (HCT-116) cancer cells in a co-culture scenario. Targeting peptides can be used to achieve site- or cell-specific delivery, and it has been shown that these peptides increase in targeting specificity when paired with dendrimers. Specifically, gemcitabine-loaded YIGSR-CMCht/PAMAM, a unique kind of dendrimer nanoparticle, induces a targeted mortality on these cancer cells. This is performed via selective interaction of the dendrimer with laminin receptors. Peptide dendrimers may be employed in the future to precisely target cancer cells and deliver chemotherapeutic agents.

The cellular uptake mechanism of dendrimers can also be tuned using chemical targeting modifications. Non-modified PAMAM-G4 dendrimer is taken up into activated microglia by fluid phase endocytosis. Conversely, mannose modification of hydroxyl PAMAM-G4 dendrimers was able to change the mechanism of internalization to mannose-receptor (CD206) mediated endocytosis. Additionally, mannose modification was able to change the biodistribution in the rest of the body in rabbits.

==== Pharmacokinetics and pharmacodynamics ====
Dendrimers have the potential to completely change the pharmacokinetic and pharmacodynamic (PK/PD) profiles of a drug. As carriers, the PK/PD is no longer determined by the drug itself but by the dendrimer's localization, drug release, and dendrimer excretion. ADME properties are very highly tunable by varying dendrimer size, structure, and surface characteristics. While G9 dendrimers accumulate very heavily to the liver and spleen, G6 dendrimers tend to accumulate more broadly. As molecular weight increases, urinary clearance and plasma clearance decrease while terminal half-life increases.

==== Routes of delivery ====
To increase patient compliance with prescribed treatment, delivery of drugs orally is often preferred to other routes of drug administration. However oral bioavailability of many drugs tends to be very low. Dendrimers can be used to increase the solubility and stability of orally-administered drugs and increase drug penetration through the intestinal membrane. The bioavailability of PAMAM dendrimers conjugated to a chemotherapeutic has been studied in mice; it was found that around 9% of dendrimer administered orally was found intact in circulation and that minimal dendrimer degradation occurred in the gut.

Intravenous dendrimer delivery shows promise as gene vectors to deliver genes to various organs in the body, and even tumors. One study found that through intravenous injection, a combination of PPI dendrimers and gene complexes resulted in gene expression in the liver, and another study showed that a similar injection regressed the growth of tumors in observed animals.

The primary obstacle to transdermal drug delivery is the epidermis. Hydrophobic drugs have a very difficult time penetrating the skin layer, as they partition heavily into skin oils. Recently, PAMAM dendrimers have been used as delivery vehicles for NSAIDS to increase hydrophilicity, allowing greater drug penetration. These modifications act as polymeric transdermal enhancers allowing drugs to more easily penetrate the skin barrier.

Dendrimers may also act as new ophthalmic vehicles for drug delivery, which are different from the polymers currently used for this purpose. A study by Vanndamme and Bobeck used PAMAM dendrimers as ophthalmic delivery vehicles in rabbits for two model drugs and measured the ocular residence time of this delivery to be comparable and in some cases greater than current bioadhesive polymers used in ocular delivery. This result indicates that administered drugs were more active and had increased bioavailability when delivered via dendrimers than their free-drug counterparts. Additionally, photo-curable, drug-eluting dendrimer-hyaluronic acid hydrogels have been used as corneal sutures applied directly to the eye. These hydrogel sutures have shown efficacy as a medical device in rabbit models that surpasses traditional sutures and minimizes corneal scarring.

==== Brain drug delivery ====
Dendrimer drug delivery has also shown major promise as a potential solution for many traditionally difficult drug delivery problems. In the case of drug delivery to the brain, dendrimers are able to take advantage of the EPR effect and blood-brain barrier (BBB) impairment to cross the BBB effectively in vivo. For example, hydroxyl-terminated PAMAM dendrimers possess an intrinsic targeting ability to inflamed macrophages in the brain, verified using fluorescently labeled neutral generation dendrimers in a rabbit model of cerebral palsy. This intrinsic targeting has enabled drug delivery in a variety of conditions, ranging from cerebral palsy and other neuroinflammatory disorders to traumatic brain injury and hypothermic circulatory arrest, across a variety of animal models ranging from mice and rabbits to canines. Dendrimer uptake into the brain correlates with severity of inflammation and BBB impairment and it is believed that the BBB impairment is the key driving factor allowing dendrimer penetration. Localization is heavily skewed towards activated microglia. Dendrimer-conjugated N-acetyl cysteine has shown efficacy in vivo as an anti-inflammatory at more than 1000-fold lower dose than free drug on a drug basis, reversing the phenotype of cerebral palsy, Rett syndrome, macular degeneration and other inflammatory diseases.

==== Clinical trials ====
Starpharma, an Australian pharmaceutical company, has multiple products that have either already been approved for use or are in the clinical trial phase. SPL7013, also known as astodrimer sodium, is a hyperbranched polymer used in Starpharma's VivaGel line of pharmaceuticals that is currently approved to treat bacterial vaginosis and prevent the spread of HIV, HPV, and HSV in Europe, Southeast Asia, Japan, Canada, and Australia. Due to SPL7013's broad antiviral action, it has recently been tested by the company as a potential drug to treat SARS-CoV-2. The company states preliminary in-vitro studies show high efficacy in preventing SARS-CoV-2 infection in cells.

=== Gene delivery and transfection ===
The ability to deliver pieces of DNA to the required parts of a cell includes many challenges. Current research is being performed to find ways to use dendrimers to traffic genes into cells without damaging or deactivating the DNA. To maintain the activity of DNA during dehydration, the dendrimer/DNA complexes were encapsulated in a water-soluble polymer, and then deposited on or sandwiched in functional polymer films with a fast degradation rate to mediate gene transfection. Based on this method, PAMAM dendrimer/DNA complexes were used to encapsulate functional biodegradable polymer films for substrate mediated gene delivery. Research has shown that the fast-degrading functional polymer has great potential for localized transfection.

=== Sensors ===
Dendrimers have potential applications in sensors. Studied systems include proton or pH sensors using poly(propylene imine), cadmium-sulfide/polypropylenimine tetrahexacontaamine dendrimer composites to detect fluorescence signal quenching, and poly(propylenamine) first and second generation dendrimers for metal cation photodetection amongst others. Research in this field is vast and ongoing due to the potential for multiple detection and binding sites in dendritic structures.

=== Nanoparticles ===
Dendrimers also are used in the synthesis of monodisperse metallic nanoparticles. Poly(amidoamine), or PAMAM, dendrimers are utilized for their tertiary amine groups at the branching points within the dendrimer. Metal ions are introduced to an aqueous dendrimer solution and the metal ions form a complex with the lone pair of electrons present at the tertiary amines. After complexation, the ions are reduced to their zerovalent states to form a nanoparticle that is encapsulated within the dendrimer. These nanoparticles range in width from 1.5 to 10 nanometers and are called dendrimer-encapsulated nanoparticles.

=== Other applications ===
Given the widespread use of pesticides, herbicides and insecticides in modern farming, dendrimers are also being used by companies to help improve the delivery of agrochemicals to enable healthier plant growth and to help fight plant diseases.

Dendrimers are also being investigated for use as blood substitutes. Their steric bulk surrounding a heme-mimetic centre significantly slows degradation compared to free heme, and prevents the cytotoxicity exhibited by free heme. Dendritic functional polymer polyamidoamine (PAMAM) is used to prepare core shell structure i.e. microcapsules and utilized in formulation of self-healing coatings of conventional and renewable origins.

Different generations of polyamidoamine dendrimers have recently been implemented as selective contacts in photovoltaic devices.

=== Drug delivery ===
Dendrimers in drug-delivery systems is an example of various host–guest interactions. The interaction between host and guest, the dendrimer and the drug, respectively, can either be hydrophobic or covalent. Hydrophobic interaction between host and guest is considered "encapsulated," while covalent interactions are considered to be conjugated. The use of dendrimers in medicine has shown to improve drug delivery by increasing the solubility and bioavailability of the drug. In conjunction, dendrimers can increase both cellular uptake and targeting ability, and decrease drug resistance.

The solubility of various nonsteroidal anti-inflammatory drugs (NSAID) increases when they are encapsulated in PAMAM dendrimers. This study shows the enhancement of NSAID solubility is due to the electrostatic interactions between the surface amine groups in PAMAM and the carboxyl groups found in NSAIDs. Contributing to the increase in solubility are the hydrophobic interactions between the aromatic groups in the drugs and the interior cavities of the dendrimer. When a drug is encapsulated within a dendrimer, its physical and physiological properties remains unaltered, including non-specificity and toxicity. However, when the dendrimer and the drug are covalently linked together, it can be used for specific tissue targeting and controlled release rates. Covalent conjugation of multiple drugs on dendrimer surfaces can pose a problem of insolubility.

This principle is also being studied for cancer treatment application. Several groups have encapsulated anti-cancer medications such as: Camptothecin, Methotrexate, and Doxorubicin. Results from these research has shown that dendrimers have increased aqueous solubility, slowed release rate, and possibly control cytotoxicity of the drugs. Cisplatin has been conjugated to PAMAM dendrimers that resulted in the same pharmacological results as listed above, but the conjugation also helped in accumulating cisplatin in solid tumors in intravenous administration.

Toxicity of Dendrimers

In 2006, a detailed investigation on the toxicological profile of fifth generation poly propyleneimine dendrimers was published.^{[91]} They investigated four forms of functionalized dendrimers including Lysine, Phenyalalanine, Mannose and Lactose. These dendrimeric systems were investigated for haemolytic toxicity, cytotoxicity, hematological profile and immunogenicity. Their study revealed that the functionalized forms of dendrimers were less toxic and have greater potential as drug delivery vehicle. In another study, In vivo toxicity studies were performed on Wister rats administering different doses of surface engineered 5th generation poly(propyleneimine) dendrimers. ^{[92]} The study investigated acute and chronic toxicity of naked dendrimers and its functionalized derivatives, and reported cytotoxicity apart from hepatotoxicity of naked dendrimers as evident from elevated serum biochemical parameters and tissue histopathology. Their studies revealed that surface engineering of dendrimers not only reduces cytotoxicity and hepatotoxicity but also improves biocompatibility.^{[92]}

== See also ==
- Dendronized polymer
- Ferrocene-containing dendrimers
- Metallodendrimer
