= Dendronized polymer =

Linear polymer whose repeat units have regularly-branching side chains

In polymer chemistry and materials science, dendronized polymers (British English: dendronised polymers; from dendro- 'tree') are polymers. A dendrozined polymer has a linear backbone, and on each repeat unit of the linear backbone, dendrons are attached. A dendron is a regularly-branched, tree-like polymer, itself consisting of repeat units. If the dendrons are large, the polymer backbone is wrapped around itself, to give sausage-like, cylindrical shape.

Figure 1 (left) shows a cartoon representation, with the backbone in red and the dendron-like cake slices in green. Figure 1 (right) shows a concrete example. The backbone is polymethylmethacrylate (PMMA), the methyl group (−CH_{3}) of which is replaced by a dendron of the third generation (three consecutive branching points).

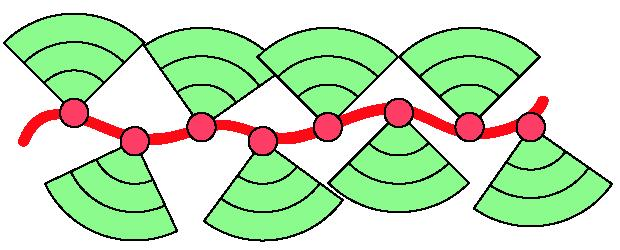

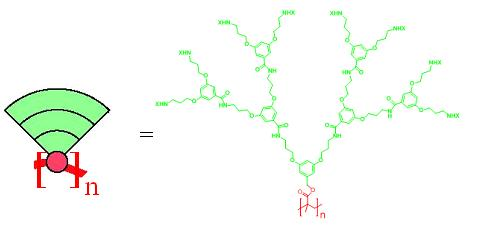

Figure 1. Cartoon representation (left) and a concrete example of a third generation dendronized polymer (right). The peripheral amine groups are modified by a substituent X which often is a protection group. Upon deprotection and modification substantial property changes can be achieved. The subscript n denotes the number of repeat units.

== Structure and applications ==
Dendronized polymers can contain several thousands of dendrons in one macromolecule and have a stretched out, anisotropic structure. In this regard they differ from the more or less spherically shaped dendrimers, where a few dendrons are attached to a small, dot-like core resulting in an isotropic structure. Depending on dendron generation, the polymers differ in thickness as the atomic force microscopy image shows (Figure 2). Neutral and charged dendronized polymers are highly soluble in organic solvents and in water, respectively. This is due to their low tendency to entangle. Dendronized polymers have been synthesized with, e.g., polymethylmethacrylate, polystyrene, polyacetylene, polyphenylene, polythiophene, polyfluorene, poly(phenylene vinylene), poly(phenylene acetylene), polysiloxane, polyoxanorbornene, poly(ethylene imine) (PEI) backbones. Molar masses up to 200,000,000 g/mol have been obtained. Dendronized polymers have been investigated for/as bulk structure control, responsivity to external stimuli, single molecule chemistry, templates for nanoparticle formation, catalysis, electro-optical devices, and bio-related applications. Particularly attractive is the use of water-soluble dendronized polymers for the immobilization of enzymes on solid surfaces (inside glass tubes or microfluidic devices) and for the preparation of dendronized polymer-enzyme conjugates.

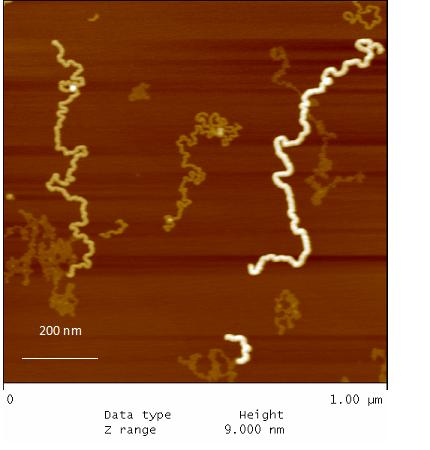
Figure 2. Atomic force microscopy height image of co-prepared dendronized polymers of generation one through four (PG1-PG4) reflecting the different thicknesses and apparent persistence lengths for each generation

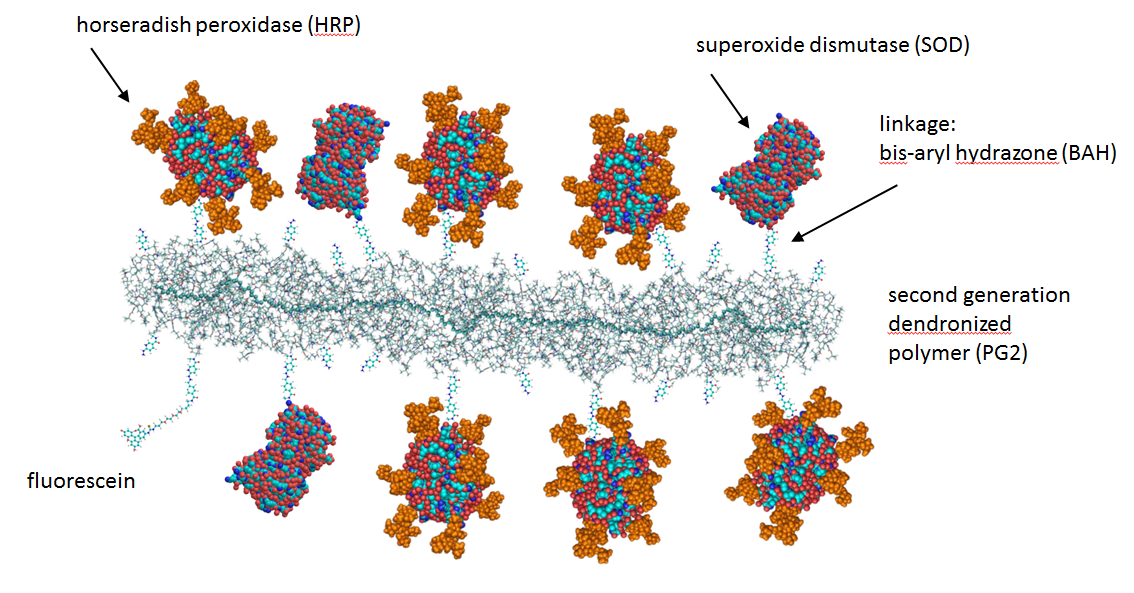
Figure 3. Schematic representation of a molecular hybrid structure (conjugate) between a dendronized polymer and the two different enzymes HRP (horseradish peroxidase) and SOD (Cu,Zn-superoxide dismutase). PDB (SOD): 1SXA; PDB (HRP): 1ATJ; HRP sugar modification from Gray & Montgomery, Carbohydrate Research, 2006, 341, 198-209. Denpol structure: Bertran et al. RSC Adv., 2013, 3, 126-140.

== Synthesis ==
There are two main approaches to synthesize dendronized polymers: macromonomer and attach-to.

For the macromonomer route, the experimenter first synthesize macromonomers: monomers that are attached to dendrons. The experimenter then linearly polymerize the macromonomers.

For the attach-to route, the experimenter start by linearly polymerizing the monomer, then add the dendrons generation by generation, directly on the polymer.

The macromonomer route results in shorter chains, but allows for higher generations. The attach-to route is the opposite. It allows longer chains, but is prone to structural non-uniformities if the experimenter attempts to make the dendron generations high, as an enormous number of chemical reactions have to be performed.

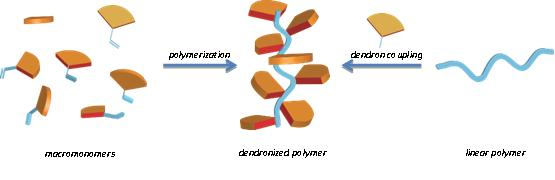
Figure 4. The two main synthetic approaches: The macromonomer route (left) and the attach-to route (right).

== History ==
The name “dendronized polymer” which meanwhile is internationally accepted was coined by Schlüter in 1998. The first report on such a macromolecule which at that time was called “Rod-shaped Dendrimer” goes back to a patent by Tomalia in 1987 and was followed by Percec's first mentioning in the open literature of a polymer with “tapered side chains” in 1992. In 1994 the potential of these polymers as cylindrical nanostructures was recognized. Many groups worldwide contributed to this field. They can be found in review articles.

== See also ==
- Dendrimer
- Polymer brush
