= Drug Delivery (journal) =

- Discipline: Pharmaceutical science
- Language: English
- Edited by: Moein Moghimi

Publication details
- History: 1993–present
- Publisher: Taylor & Francis
- Frequency: 9/year
- Open access: Yes
- License: Creative Commons Attribution
- Impact factor: 6.0 (2022)

Standard abbreviations
- ISO 4: Drug Deliv.

Indexing
- CODEN: DDELEB
- ISSN: 1071-7544 (print); 1521-0464 (web)
- LCCN: 2006233347
- OCLC no.: 321019930

Links
- Journal homepage; Online access; Online archive

Drug Delivery is a peer-reviewed open access medical journal covering research on all aspects of drug delivery, a core aspect of drug development. It is published by Taylor & Francis and since 2024 the Editor-in-Chief is Prof Moein Moghimi. Biochemist Alfred Stracher founded the journal in 1997 and was its editor-in-chief until his death in 2013. According to the Journal Citation Reports, the journal has a 2023 impact factor of 6.5.
