= Ferrocene-containing dendrimers =

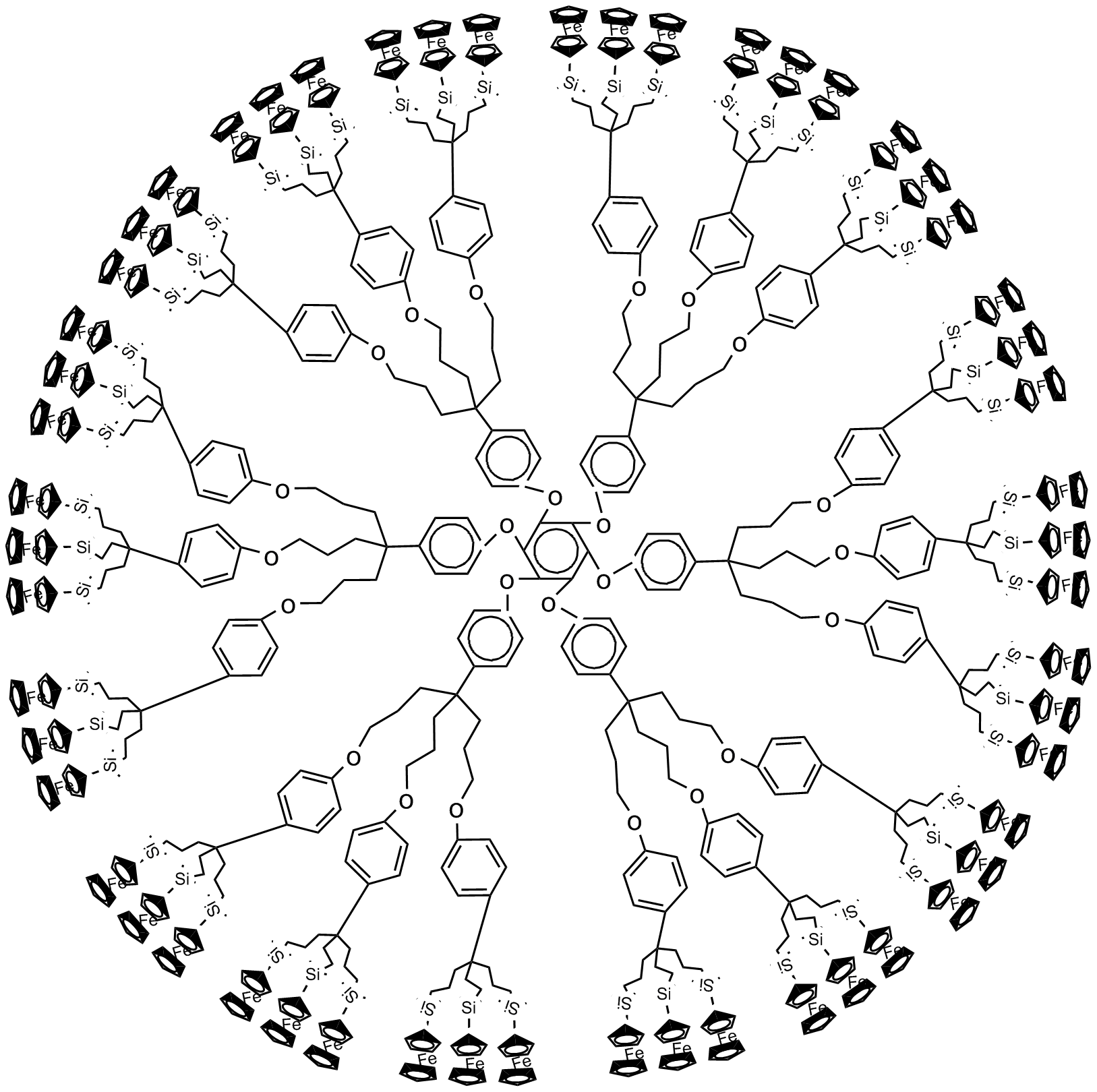
Figure 1. A 54-ferrocene dendrimer

Ferrocene-containing dendrimers are dendrimers that contain ferrocene substituents. Some ferrocene-containing dendrimers feature ferrocene cores and others do not. All feature with peripheral ferrocene groups.

== Synthesis ==
Ferrocene-containing dendrimers can be synthesized by both convergent and divergent methods. Some of the first dendrimers of this type, were made by attaching ferrocene units to small silicon containing dendrimers.

Dendrimers with peripheral ferrocene groups are usually synthesized by attaching ferrocene to the core by either olefin metathesis or by hydrosilylation. As an example, tetraallylsilane undergoes Pt-catalyzed hydrosilylation to form the core. This core was then reacted with ferrocenyllithium to form 1. Convergent approaches can also be used to make dendrimers with peripheral ferrocene. As an example, figure 1 shows a 54-ferrocene dendrimer which was synthesized by a fast convergent approach.

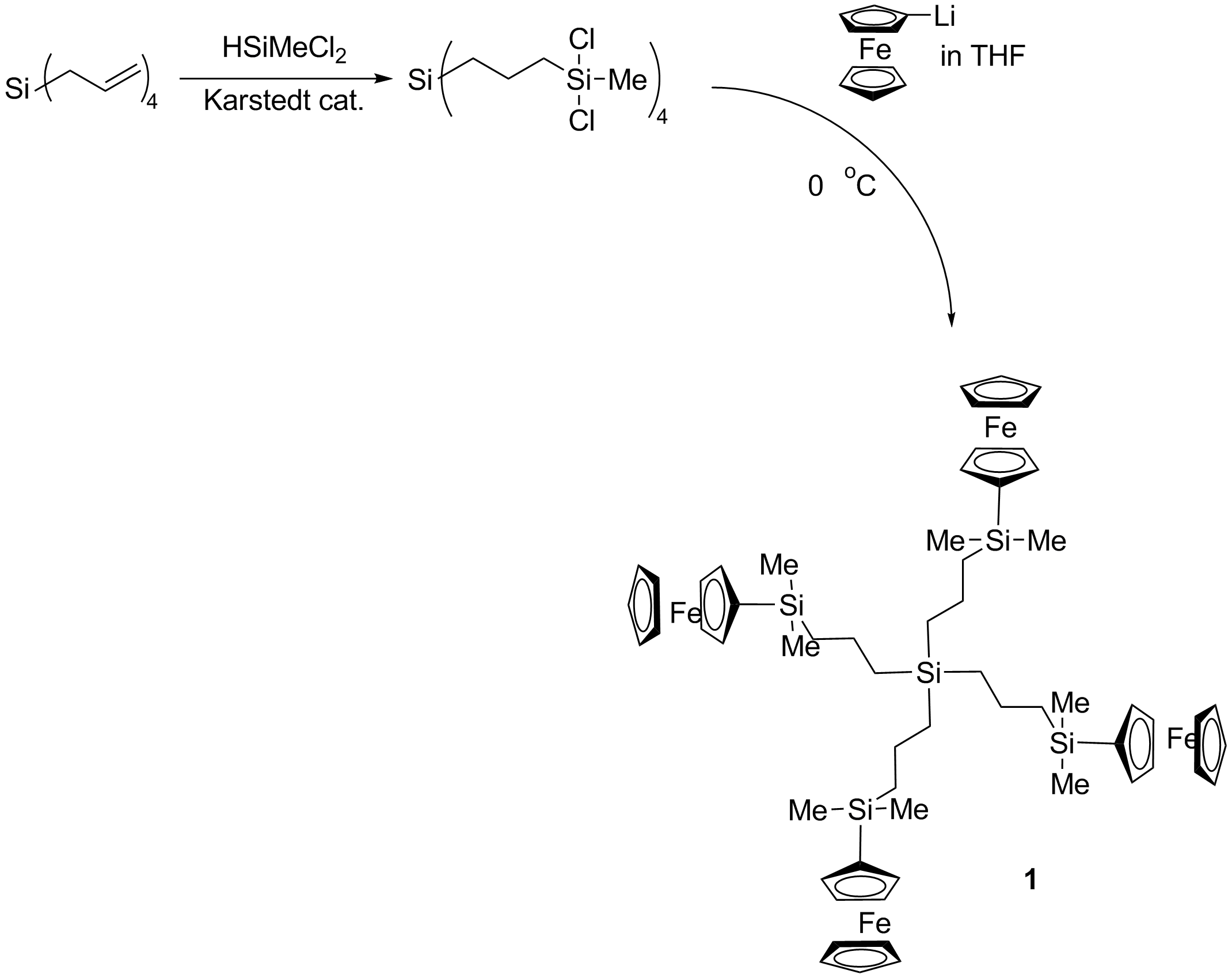
Synthesis of compound 1

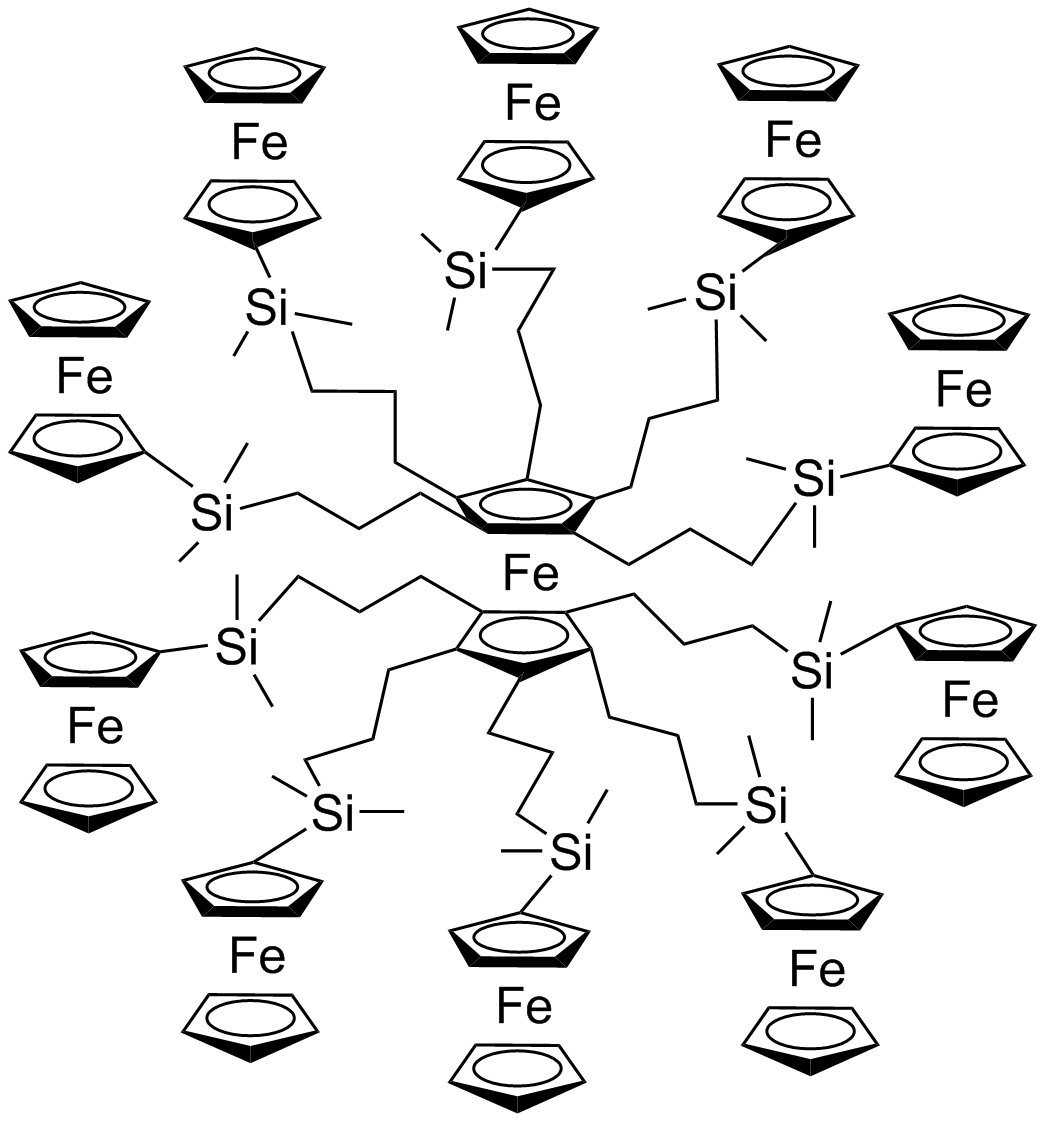
A 10-ferrocene dendrimer.

Dendrimers with ferrocene cores have been synthesized by decorating suitably functionalized ferrocenes, e.g., decaallylferrocene.

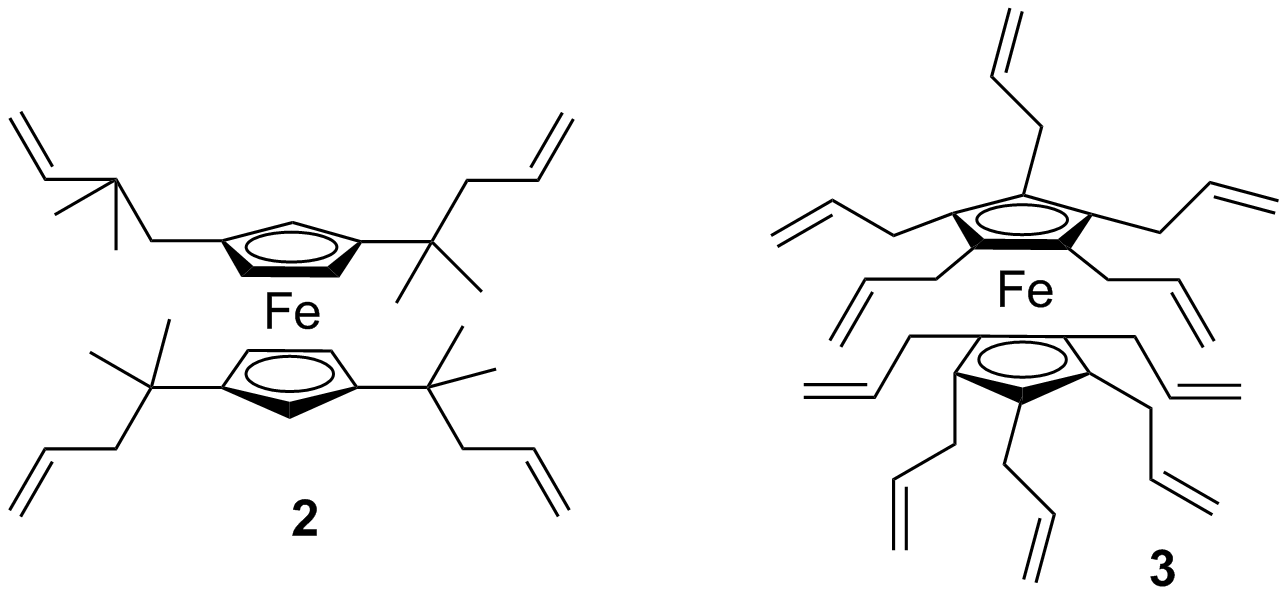
Synthesis of compound 1

== Properties and applications ==
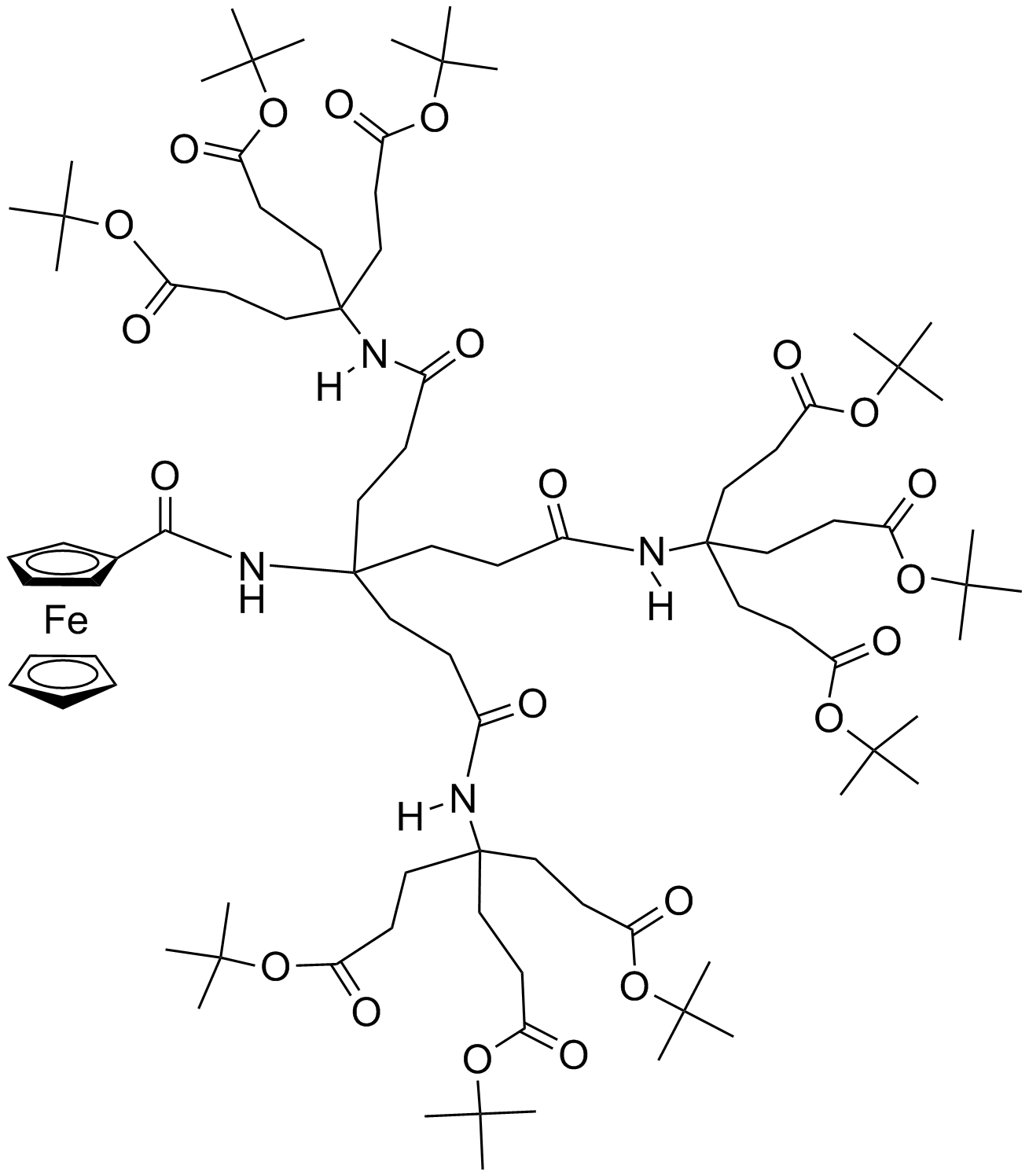
Figure 3. An asymmetric dendrimer with a ferrocene core

No applications have been identified for ferrocene-containing dendrimers. They exhibit multielectron redox indicating that the ferrocenyl moieties are essentially noninteracting redox centers.

== See also ==
- Dendrimer
