= Precision Nanomedicine =

Open-access scientific journal

Precision Nanomedicine (ISSN 2639-9431) is a platinum open-access peer-reviewed medical journal covering nanomedicine. It is published by Andover House Inc. and the editor-in-chief is Lajos P. Balogh. The journal was established in March 2018 with the support of the European Foundation for Clinical Nanomedicine. Articles cover original research as well as replication studies and negative results in the form of communications, reviews, editorials, perspectives, opinions, case studies, technical notes, and letters to the editor. There are no article processing charges.

== Abstracting and indexing ==
The journal is abstracted and indexed in Scopus, the Directory of Open Access Journals, and by the Norvegian Directorate for Higher Education
