= Dendrimer-encapsulated nanoparticles =

Dendrimer-encapsulated nanoparticles (DENs) are nanoparticles ranging from 1.5 to 10 nm that are synthesized by a template approach using dendrimers. Monometallic, bimetallic and semiconductor nanoparticles have been synthesized using this method. The primary use for DEN's is as a catalyst due to their extremely high surface area to volume ratio. Advantages that DENs have over other nanoparticles is that they are monodisperse and easy to make.

== Synthesis ==
The first component in DEN synthesis is the dendrimer itself. By using different sizes, or generations, of dendrimers it is possible to control the size of the nanoparticle to be synthesized. Although there are many types of dendrimers, the most common is the poly(amidoamine) (PAMAM) dendrimer. These types of dendrimers are predominantly terminated with either amine or hydroxyl groups. The notation for these dendrimers are in the form of Gx-R, where x is generation of the dendrimer and R is the terminal group of the dendrimer (in most cases R= -OH or -NH_{2}) When metal ions are introduced to a dendrimer in aqueous solution they form a complex with the tertiary amines of the dendrimer notated as Gx-R(M^{p+})_{n}, where M^{p+} refers to the metal ions used and n refers to the average number of metal ions complexed within each dendrimer. After a complex has formed, a reducing agent such as sodium borohydride is introduced in a high molar excess and the metal ions are reduced to their zerovalent form and come together within the dendrimer to form the DEN notated as Gx-R(M_{n}) where M is the zerovalent metal used and n is the number of metal atoms.

== Characterization ==
DENs can be characterized mainly by ultraviolet–visible spectroscopy. The charge-transfer complex that forms between the metal ions and the dendrimer exhibits a ligand-to-metal charge transfer, or LMCT, band in the UV-Vis spectrum, indicating that a complex has formed. The specific wavelength of occurrence for these LMCT peaks are different for each metal.
