= Polymer brush =

Surface coating consisting of tethered polymers

Polymer brush (schematic)

"bottle brush"

In materials science, a polymer brush is the name given to a surface coating consisting of polymers tethered to a surface. The brush may be either in a solvated state, where the tethered polymer layer consists of polymer and solvent, or in a melt state, where the tethered chains completely fill up the space available. These polymer layers can be tethered to flat substrates such as silicon wafers, or highly curved substrates such as nanoparticles. Also, polymers can be tethered in high density to another single polymer chain, although this arrangement is normally named a bottle brush. Additionally, there is a separate class of polyelectrolyte brushes, when the polymer chains themselves carry an electrostatic charge.

The brushes are often characterized by the high density of grafted chains. The limited space then leads to a strong extension of the chains. Brushes can be used to stabilize colloids, reduce friction between surfaces, and to provide lubrication in artificial joints.

Polymer brushes have been modeled with molecular dynamics, Monte Carlo methods, Brownian dynamics simulations, and molecular theories.

== Structure ==
Polymer molecule within a brush. The drawing shows the chain elongation decreasing from the attachment point and vanishing at free end. The "blobs", schematized as circles, represent the (local) length scale at which the statistics of the chain change from a 3D random walk (at smaller length scales) to a 2D in-plane random walk and a 1D normal directed walk (at larger length scales).

Polymer molecules within a brush are stretched away from the attachment surface as a result of the fact that they repel each other (steric repulsion or osmotic pressure). More precisely, they are more elongated near the attachment point and unstretched at the free end, as depicted on the drawing.

More precisely, within the approximation derived by Milner, Witten, Cates, the average density of all monomers in a given chain is always the same up to a prefactor:

$\phi(z,\rho)=\frac{\partial n}{\partial z}$

$n(z,\rho)=\frac{2N}{\pi}\arcsin\left(\frac{z}{\rho}\right)$

where $\rho$ is the altitude of the end monomer and $N$ the number of monomers per chain.

The averaged density profile $\epsilon(\rho)$ of the end monomers of all attached chains, convoluted with the above density profile for one chain, determines the density profile of the brush as a whole:

$\phi(z)=\int_z^\infty \frac{\partial n(z,\rho)}{\partial z}\,\epsilon(\rho)\,{\rm d}\rho$

A dry brush has a uniform monomer density up to some altitude $H$. One can show that the corresponding end monomer density profile is given by:

$\epsilon_{\rm dry}(\rho,H)=\frac{\rho/H}{Na\sqrt{1-\rho^2/H^2}}$

where $a$ is the monomer size.

The above monomer density profile $n(z,\rho)$ for one single chain minimizes the total elastic energy of the brush,

$U=\int_0^\infty\epsilon(\rho)\,{\rm d}\rho\,\int_0^N\,{\rm d}n\,\frac{kT}{2Na^2}\left(\frac{\partial z(n,\rho)}{\partial n}\right)^2$

regardless of the end monomer density profile $\epsilon(\rho)$, as shown in.

== From a dry brush to any brush ==
As a consequence, the structure of any brush can be derived from the brush density profile $\phi(z)$. Indeed, the free end distribution is simply a convolution of the density profile with the free end distribution of a dry brush:

$\epsilon(\rho)=\int_\rho^\infty -\frac{{\rm d}\phi(H)}{{\rm d}H}\epsilon_{\rm dry}(\rho,H)$.

Correspondingly, the brush elastic free energy is given by:

$\frac{F_{\rm el}}{kT}=\frac{\pi^2}{24N^2a^5}\int_0^\infty\left\{-z^3\frac{{\rm d}\phi(z)}{{\rm d}z}\right\}{\rm d}z$.

This method has been used to derive wetting properties of polymer melts on polymer brushes of the same species and to understand fine interpenetration asymmetries between copolymer lamellae that may yield very unusual non-centrosymmetric lamellar structures.

== Applications ==
Polymer brushes can be used in Area-selective deposition. Area-selective deposition is a promising technique for positional self-alignment of materials at a prepatterned surface.

== See also ==
- Dendronized polymer
