= Alfred Stracher =

American chemist

- Born: 1931; Albany, New York
- Died: 2013 (aged 81–82)
- Education: Rensselaer Polytechnic Institute (BSc): Columbia University (PhD)
- Known for: Drug Delivery (Taylor & Francis)
- Scientific career
- Fields: Biochemistry
- Workplaces: SUNY Downstate Medical Center

Alfred Stracher (1931-2013) was an American biochemist and the founder and editor-in-chief of Drug Delivery. During his lifetime, he was Distinguished Professor of Biochemistry at SUNY Downstate Medical Center.

== Early life and education ==
Alfred Stracher was born in Albany, New York in 1931. He graduated from Rensselaer Polytechnic Institute in 1952 with a Bachelor of Science in Chemistry. He received his PhD in Chemistry from Columbia University in 1956.

== Academic career ==
From 1956 until 1959, Stracher was a postdoctoral fellow of the National Foundation for Infantile Paralysis; his first fellowship was with Lyman C. Craig at the Rockefeller Institute for Medical Research from 1956 to 1958, the second was with Kaj Ulrik Linderstrøm-Lang at Carlsberg Laboratory from 1958 to 1959.

He went on to become an assistant professor of biochemistry at SUNY Downstate Medical Center. He was chairman of biochemistry at SUNY from 1972 until 2006. Between 1982 and 1988, Stracher was dean of research and development in the department. He was appointed a Distinguished Professor in 1997.

He held honorary positions as a visiting professor at King's College London and at Oxford University. He was awarded a Guggenheim Fellowship in 1974, he was also a fellow of Merton College, Accademia dei Lincei, and the Commonwealth Fund.

In 2005, Stracher established the Robert F. Furchgott Society to honor the scientific achievements and groundbreaking work of Furchgott. The society awards outstanding postdoctoral students and clinical fellows.

=== Editorial activities ===
Stracher was the founder and co-editor of Drug Delivery until his death.

== Death and legacy ==
He died in 2013 due to complications from leukemia. The Alfred Stracher Memorial Fund at SUNY provides annual awards to distinguished faculty.

== Personal life ==
He was married to Dorothy Stracher, with whom he had three children.
