= Ligand-targeted liposome =

Ligand-targeted liposomes for use in medical applications

Representative image of the constituents of a basic liposome

A ligand-targeted liposome (LTL) is a nanocarrier with specific ligands attached to its surface to enhance localization for targeted drug delivery. The targeting ability of LTLs enhances cellular localization and uptake of these liposomes for therapeutic or diagnostic purposes. LTLs have the potential to enhance drug delivery by decreasing peripheral systemic toxicity, increasing in vivo drug stability, enhancing cellular uptake, and increasing efficiency for chemotherapeutics and other applications.

Liposomes are beneficial in therapeutic manufacturing because of low batch-to-batch variability, easy synthesis, favorable scalability, and strong biocompatibility. Ligand-targeting technology enhances liposomes by adding targeting properties for directed drug delivery.

== Ligand selection ==
Ligands are molecules responsible for binding to receptors in the cellular targeting process. Surface-coupled ligands offer a greater degree of freedom to move on the liposome membrane for optimal interactions.

Ligands are typically monoclonal antibodies (mAbs) or antibody fragments, but can also include other molecules such as ARPG, proteins, peptides, vitamins, carbohydrates, and glycoproteins. The choice of ligand can significantly influence the behavioral and functional properties of a ligand-targeted liposome. Antibody fragments have lower immunogenicity and improved pharmacokinetics. mAbs are unique and can be used for inhibition of DNA repair, terminating the cell cycle, and triggering apoptosis, all of which factor into applications for anticancer drugs. Peptides are relatively easy and affordable to prepare with low antigenicity and lower opsonization, which are thus more resistant to enzymatic degradation. Proteins can target the transferrin receptor membrane glycoprotein. Sugars and vitamins are recognized by cellular transport receptors.

Ligand choice is based on receptor expression, ligand internalization, binding affinity, and type of ligand. Ligands alone are not able to carry an efficient payload for therapeutic levels but can carry more of the agent when combined with liposomes.

== Ligand attachment to liposome ==
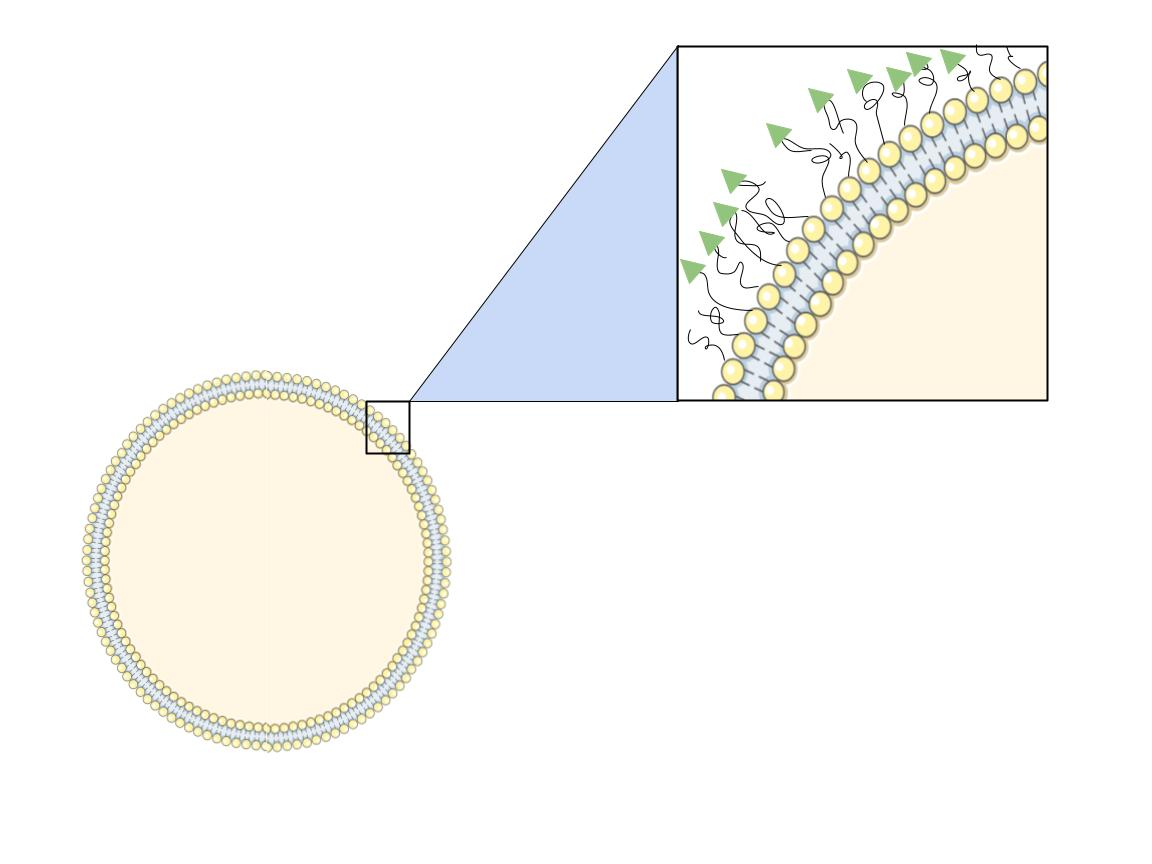
Liposomes can be functionalized with long-chain, high-density brush regime PEG; then a ligand binds to the PEG chain, resulting in an LTL.

Ligands can be attached to liposomes through ligation to create ligand-targeted liposomes in a variety of ways. Liposomes have a lipid outer layer that can be used to bind ligands. Conjugation of the ligand to the surface of a liposome can be achieved through multiple routes. Covalent binding is a prominent way due to the anchoring between the long-chain fatty acids and the ligand. Combinations of covalent binding through disulfide linkages, heating, and hydrophobic interactions can be used depending on the properties of the liposome and ligand. Adsorption and membrane fusion are non-covalent methods for the attachment of monoclonal antibodies. Chemical linkages such as covalent bonds are more effective at increasing the amount of attached ligand to the carrier as opposed to non-covalent methods.

During chemical coupling for manufacturing, it is crucial that ligands maintain their integrity when attached to the liposome surface. If ligands, such as antibodies, do not maintain binding specificity, proper orientation, and coupling efficiency, the liposome will not be effective.

== Cellular interaction and delivery of contained agent ==
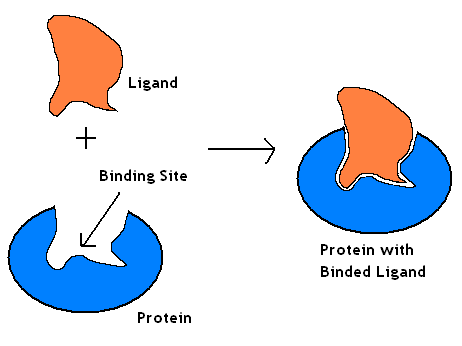
A ligand docks and binds to a specific target receptor (in this case, a protein)

Since the ligand is responsible for cellular interaction, it is chosen for the application depending on the target site. The target site contains binding sites that the ligand targets to deliver the LTL to the desired area. Favorable target site characteristics are determined by what is commonly expressed by tissues of the pathology of interest. Determinants can include histones, basement membrane fibrinogen, selectins, adhesion molecules, and other ligand targets. For example, in some human cancer tumors such as ovarian carcinomas, folate is over-expressed. LTLs for targeting cancer often use a ligand that targets this over-expression of folate to localize drug delivery to the desired area. The tumor microenvironment of solid tumor cancers is also a unique targeting site. Tumor endothelial cells are important for angiogenesis, which is key to tumor growth; therefore, using LTLs to target these cells can limit the growth and vascularization of a tumor.

There are three ways in which liposomes can enter the cellular membrane: (a) phagocytosis, (b) pinocytosis, (c) receptor-mediated endocytosis.

Ligand-targeted liposomes utilize active targeting to interact with the desired cells. Once administered intravenously into blood circulation, ligand-targeted liposomes must travel to reach the target area to deliver their contents. LTLs retain the contained agent until the process of cellular uptake.

Receptor-mediated endocytosis is the most common way LTLs deliver material to the cell. The targeting ligand connected to the liposome attaches to the binding site found on the targeted cell. The LTL's contents are transported to Lysosomes to be processed. This process allows the molecules to cross the blood-brain barrier, which allows the drug to be delivered to tissue that is relatively difficult to reach without a specific mechanism. Less commonly, pinocytosis or phagocytosis may be used for cellular uptake of the liposome. Certain recognition sites, such as ecto-NAD+oglycohydro|ase, mediate uptake to aid in the internalization and effectiveness of the LTLs.

The remainder of LTLs in circulation after binding to the target site are mainly cleared through the reticuloendothelial system (RES). The RES includes different organs including the kidneys, lungs, spleen, liver, bone marrow, and lymph nodes. The liver is the primary organ for the clearance of LTLs. The RES is most likely able to clear LTLs due to fenestrations in their microvasculature that allow for extravasation. Phagocytic cells within the RES break down LTLs.

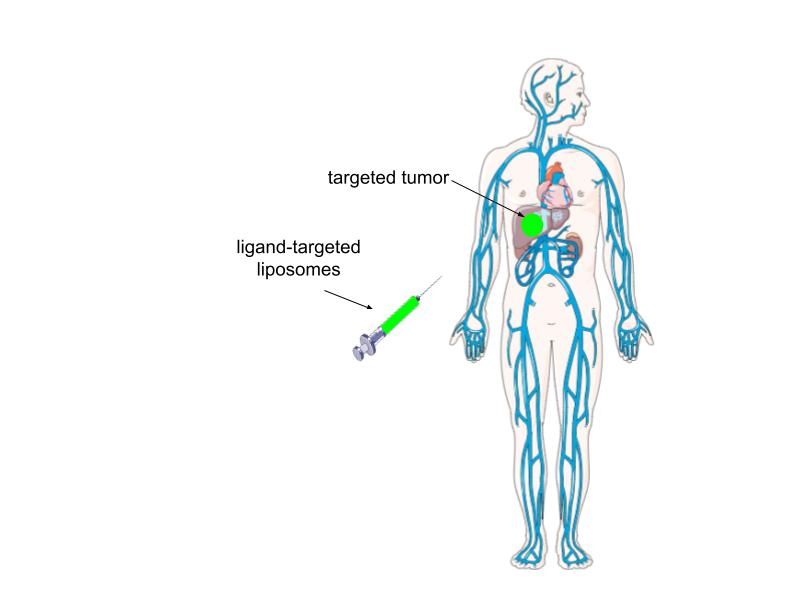
LTLs can be loaded with an imaging agent and injected to specifically bind to desired tissue, such as a tumor.

== Applications of LTLs in medicine ==
Ligand-targeted liposomes are used for a variety of applications depending on the liposome, ligand, and liposome contents.

Ligand-targeted liposomes can be used for diagnostics through imaging. The liposomes can contain imaging agents to aid in visualization such as fluorescent dyes, labeling probes, and contrast agents. Commonly, a radioactive gamma-emitter, fluorescent marker, or magnetic resonance imaging (MRI) agent is encapsulated in the liposome for this application. The active targeting mechanism of LTLs allows the target tissue to retain the imaging agent while the remaining agent is cleared from circulation. The ligand-targeted liposomes increase the specificity and sensitivity of the images taken through positron emission tomography (PET), single-photon emission computed tomography (SPECT), and MRI techniques through the ligand localization to receptors of interest. Biotinylated liposomes containing [^{67}Ga] coupled with a later injection of avidin have been shown to reduce background signal and produce the needed contrast for imaging while reducing the circulation time of radioactive imaging agent. Molecular imaging of processes over time in vivo is also made possible using ligand-targeted nanoparticles. As of 2015, many ligand-targeted imaging agents such as MIP-1404, MIP-1405, MIP-1072, MIP-109, and ^{18}F-DCFBC were undergoing clinical trials. The ability of a liposome to encapsulate these imaging agents and deliver them to specific regions through ligand targeting is helpful for precision detection.

Ligand-targeted liposomes are a promising method of drug delivery. These systems are efficient in delivering the drug to localized areas with low peripheral distribution, which minimizes off-target effects. The favorable biodistribution to target tissue is an encouraging property of this drug delivery system. In addition to highly targeting tissue, LTLs have a short circulating half-life, so they can be quickly cleared from the bloodstream. LTLs can be used to deliver AuNRs for localized delivery of photo-thermal therapy in cancer treatment. Photodynamic therapy (PDT) is a non-invasive cancer therapy that relies on a photosensitizing (PS) pro-drug to interact with light and oxygen as a cancer therapeutic agent. PSs can be encapsulated in LTLs—allowing them to move through systemic circulation to the tumor site for ligand binding—to specify the area of their effect. Using PDT causes damage to cancer cells and tumor microvasculature. There are many liposome-based products currently approved or undergoing clinical trials.

Aside from cancer therapies, ligand-targeted liposomes can also be used to target inflammation in the body that may be present due to rheumatoid arthritis, psoriasis, vascular inflammation, and organ transplantation. E-selectin is a cell-specific receptor expressed by inflamed endothelium that ligands can target.

LTLs also have the potential for localized treatment in fungal infections. AmBisome (L-AMB) is an LTL that contains Amphotericin B (AMPH-B), an anti-fungal treatment that is effective for a broad variety of fungal infections. AMPH-B can be toxic after prolonged exposure, making it a good candidate for the targeting and rapid clearing of systemic circulation of LTLs. AmBisome is also effective due to the inflammation in the area of fungal activity, which increases vascular permeation.

Marketed liposomes
| Cancer therapy | Fungal diseases | Analgesics | Photodynamic therapy | Viral vaccines |
|---|---|---|---|---|
| DaunoXome; Depocyt; Doxil; Marqibo; Mepact; Myocet; Onivyde | Abelcet; AmBisome; Amphotec | DepoDur; Exparel | Visudyne | Epaxal; Inflexal V |

== Disadvantages ==
Consistently producing ligand-targeted liposomes through traditional methods is difficult. The process can be tedious, challenging to control and result in a poorly defined system. Using the 'post-insertion' technique—in which Micelles formed from PEG-linked ligands are incubated with pre-formed, drug-loaded, non-targeted liposomes to combine and form LTLs—can limit the associated manufacturing challenges.

When using certain ligands, such as antibodies, the risk for an immunological reaction poses a risk. Liposome design including size, charge, morphology, composition, surface characteristics, and dose size can all influence the immune response to administered LTLs. The ligands used can elicit an immune response when introduced into the body. For example, when peptide ligands such as CDX are used for brain-targeted delivery systems, they are immunogenic and trigger an immune response. Complement Activation-Related Pseudo-allergies (CARPA) is a hypersensitivity syndrome that can be triggered when LTLs activate the innate immune system and the complement system. CARPA can cause many side effects including anaphylaxis, cardiopulmonary distress, and facial swelling. These side effects have the potential to be severe, which generates concern when administering LTLs to patients with health problems, especially cardiovascular issues. This reaction can be reduced by slowing infusion rates or incorporating the use of allergy medicines like antihistamines into the treatment regimen.

Due to the immune response, LTLs can experience the accelerated blood clearance (ABC) phenomenon. This phenomenon is more common in repeated dosage usage of LTLs, such as multi-dose PEGylated formulas, because of immunological memory. The pharmokinetics and clearance rates of the second dose have been shown to be significantly reduced while accumulation in the spleen and liver increases. This poses challenges for clinical applications of LTLs that require multiple doses to be effective.

Ligand-targeted liposomes need specific conditions to remain intact for use. Controlling environmental factors such as temperature and pH is necessary to maintain the integrity of the molecules. This can be helpful for temperature-sensitive or pH-dependent drug release conditions but is harmful if the pH changes at an inopportune time. This technology can also be used in combination with enzymes such as in Gal-Dox, which releases active doxorubicin in combination with β-Galactosidase. Making sure the compound does not encounter the enzyme too early is also important for effective usage.

There is a possibility that LTLs lead to immunosuppression. LTLs are cleared through the RES which is part of the innate immune system. Macrophage saturation to remove the liposomes could impact the ability of the phagocytic cells to function properly to conduct immune functions. Significant immune suppression has not been observed in clinical cases for therapeutic doses of LTLs containing non-cytotoxic drugs.
