= Donald Tomalia =

American chemist (born 1938)

Donald A. Tomalia (born September 5, 1938) is an American chemist who is known as one of the early discoverers of dendrimers.

== Biography ==
Tomalia earned an undergraduate degree from the University of Michigan, a master's degree from Bucknell University and a Ph.D. in physical organic chemistry from Michigan State University. He worked at Dow Chemical for many years as a research scientist then moved to the Michigan Molecular Institute as a Senior Lead Scientist. In 1979, Tomalia first reported on the synthesis of dendrimers, which have been used in nanotechnology and pharmaceuticals. The first dendrimer synthesis was noted by winning the Leonardo da Vinci Prize (Paris, 1996).

In 1990, he joined the Michigan Molecular Institute (MMI) as Professor and Director of Nanoscale Chemistry &Architecture (1990–1999). In 1992, Tomalia founded his own company, Dendritech. The company was purchased by Dow Chemical a few years later. Tomalia was the scientific director of the Center for Biologic Nanotechnology at the University of Michigan Medical School. In 2001, Tomalia started Dendritic NanoTechnologies at Central Michigan University; Starpharma of Australia provided seed money for the venture and Dow took an equity position a few years later.

In 2010, Tomalia founded NanoSynthons, LLC, in Mount Pleasant, Michigan. In 2016, he was named a fellow of the American Association for the Advancement of Science. He has been named a Thomson Reuters Citation Laureate.
