= SDT =

SDT may refer to be:

- Scottish Dance Theatre
- Self-determination theory
- Service Description Table
- Sigma Delta Tau
- Signal detection theory
- Social dominance theory
- Sonodynamic therapy
- Specially Designated Terrorist
- Shizuoka Daiichi Television
- Second demographic transition
- San Diego Trolley
