= LILFU =

LILFU stands for low intensity, low frequency ultrasound. It is a new technique devised by the team of William J. Tyler from Arizona State University to manipulate neuronal circuits using transcranial pulsed ultrasound. This could make the need of invasive (surgical) neuromodulation for some treatments and therapies unnecessary.

The science behind the method is described in a (semi-)peer-reviewed article.

LILFU has been used to stimulate rat' brains as part of the process of creating remote control animals.

== See also ==
- Transcranial Pulsed Ultrasound
- Therapeutic ultrasound
