= Oncotripsy =

Potential cancer therapy using ultrasound harmonic excitation

Oncotripsy is a potential cancer therapy under development that selectively targets cancer cells by means of ultrasound harmonic excitation at their resonance frequency. It is a type of therapeutic ultrasound.

== Approaches ==
A low intensity (ISPTA < 5 W/cm2) pulsed ultrasound (LIPSA) approach can exploit the mechanical properties of neoplastic cells to target them for destruction. Ultrasound applied at a frequency of 0.5–0.67 MHz for >20 ms causes selective disruption of a panel of breast, colon, and leukemia cancer cell models in suspension without significantly damaging healthy immune or red blood cells. The approach produces acoustic standing waves and cell-seeded cavitation that leads to cytoskeletal disruption, expression of apoptotic markers, and cell death.

A geometric cell model includes cytoplasm, nucleus and nucleolus, as well as the cell membrane and nuclear envelope. A modal analysis reveals the existence of a spectral gap between the resonant growth rates of healthy and cancerous cells along with their natural frequencies. Simulation reveals the nonlinear transient response of healthy and cancerous cells at resonance. Cancerous cells can selectively be taken to lysis via excitation without damage to healthy cells.

== History ==
Ultrasound has been used a cancer therapy since the 1930s. Initially, high-intensity beams were used to heat and destroy cells. Separately, contrast agents were injected prior to ultrasound, which then destroyed nearby cells. However, heat can harm healthy cells as well as cancer cells, and contrast agents work for only a few tumors.

In 2016 a resonant therapy technique was announced.

In 2020 a low-intensity resonant approach was demonstrated to selectively destroy tumor cells in vitro. As of this announcement the approach had not been tested in live animals.

== See also ==
- Medical ultrasound
- Therapeutic ultrasound
