= Home ultrasound =

Home ultrasound is the provision of therapeutic ultrasound via the use of a portable or home ultrasound machine. This method of medical ultrasound therapy can be used for various types of pain relief and physical therapy.

In physics, the term "ultrasound" applies to all acoustic energy with a frequency above the audible range of human hearing. The audible range of sound is 20 hertz – 20 kilohertz. Ultrasound frequency is greater than 20 kilohertz.

== Machines ==
Ultrasound energy is transferred based on the frequency and power output of the ultrasonic waves that an ultrasound machine or device creates. Home ultrasound machines and doctor's office machines both operate between 1 and 5 megahertz, however, home machines utilize pulsed ultrasonic waves while professional ultrasound machines in a doctor's office use continuous waves.

Typically, when using a home ultrasound machine, you will use it more frequently than if you were to have ultrasound treatments at a therapist's office, but the end results are the same as if using a continuous wave machine less frequently. Treatments towards a pre-workout in deep muscles and relieving tendons such as arthritis, frozen shoulder, strains, and sprains.

There are home ultrasounds available for purchase prices ranging from 46.00 U.S. dollars to 5,000.00.

== Benefits ==
Home ultrasound machines may have several benefits: long-term cost savings, portable physical therapy treatment, long-term pain relief for multiple symptoms, possible decrease in healing time, and can reduce chronic inflammation. Increase in knee range of motion after use for an injury's such as Osteoarthritis OA, which is the most common joint disorder and incidence increases with age. treatment of OA aims to reduce joint pain and stiffness, preserve and improve the joint mobility. The benefits have improvements for pain, function, and quality of life scales were effected by ultrasounds.

== Types of ultrasound therapy ==
Home ultrasound machines operate within the range of frequencies of therapeutic ultrasound, as opposed to the more commonly known diagnostic ultrasound, or Diagnostic sonography. Typical diagnostic ultrasound machines operate in the frequency range of 2-18 megahertz, whereas home ultrasound machines and therapeutic ultrasound machines operate in the frequency range of .7-3.3 megahertz. Diagnostic sonography is typically used to create an audio "image", such as during pregnancy to visualize the developing baby.

== Phonophoresis ==
Phonophoresis, also known as sonophoresis, is the use of ultrasound to enhance the delivery of topically applied drugs. Home ultrasound allows the application of topically applied analgesics and anti-inflammatory agents through the therapeutic application of ultrasound. It is widely used in hospitals to deliver drugs through the skin. Pharmacists compound the drugs by mixing them with a coupling agent (gel, cream, ointment) that transfers ultrasonic energy from the ultrasound transducer to the skin. The ultrasound potentially enhances drug transport by cavitation, microstreaming, and heating.

== Pregnancy ==
The ultrasonic wavelengths create an audio "image" as the machine therapeutically shows a baby growth inside the genetic mother's uterus. They serve as a monitor and have a validation of the predictions of ovulation and the IUI Intrauterine insemination cycles.
