= Therapeutic ultrasound =

Medical procedure for pain relief

- ICD-10-PCS: 6A7
- ICD-9-CM: 00.0

Therapeutic ultrasound refers generally to the use of ultrasound for the treatment of a medical condition or for therapeutic benefit. Physiotherapeutic ultrasound was introduced into clinical practice in the 1950s, with lithotripsy introduced in the 1980s. Other uses of ultrasound for therapeutic benefit are at various stages in transitioning from research to clinical use and include: high-intensity focused ultrasound (HIFU), targeted ultrasound drug delivery, trans-dermal ultrasound drug delivery, ultrasound hemostasis, cancer therapy, and ultrasound assisted thrombolysis Ultrasound used for therapeutic benefit often use focused ultrasound waves, however, unfocused ultrasound waves may also be used.

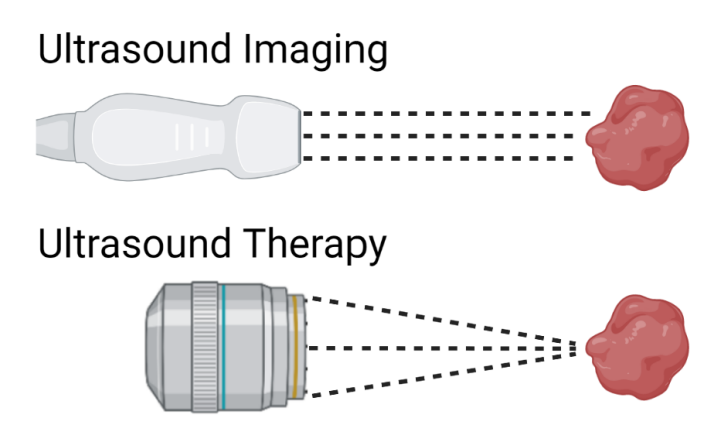
The top probe highlights the use of ultrasound for diagnostic purposes such as imaging tissue. The bottom probe demonstrates the use of ultrasound for therapeutic benefits, which often utilize high-energy, focused ultrasound beams.

In the above applications, the ultrasound passes through human tissue where it is the main source of the observed biological effect (the oscillation of abrasive dental tools at ultrasonic frequencies therefore do not belong to this class). The ultrasound within tissue consists of very high frequency sound waves, between 800,000 Hz and 20,000,000 Hz, which cannot be heard by humans.

Some of the advantages of ultrasound as a diagnostic and therapeutic tool include its safety profile, lack of radiation, portability, and low cost. Therapeutic ultrasound in medicine ranges from extracorporeal shockwave therapy for the breaking of renal calculi to HIFU in which tumors are ablated. In the research field, use of ultrasound is being explored as a mechanism of enhancing drug delivery, sorting particles, and measuring properties of tissue. In physical therapy, there is some evidence that ultrasound is more effective than placebo treatment for treating patients with arthritis pain, a range of musculoskeletal injuries and for promoting tissue healing.

== Medical uses ==
Relatively high-energy ultrasound can break up stony deposits, ablate tissue, accelerate the effect of drugs in a targeted area, assist in the measurement of the elastic properties of tissue, and sort cells or small particles for research.

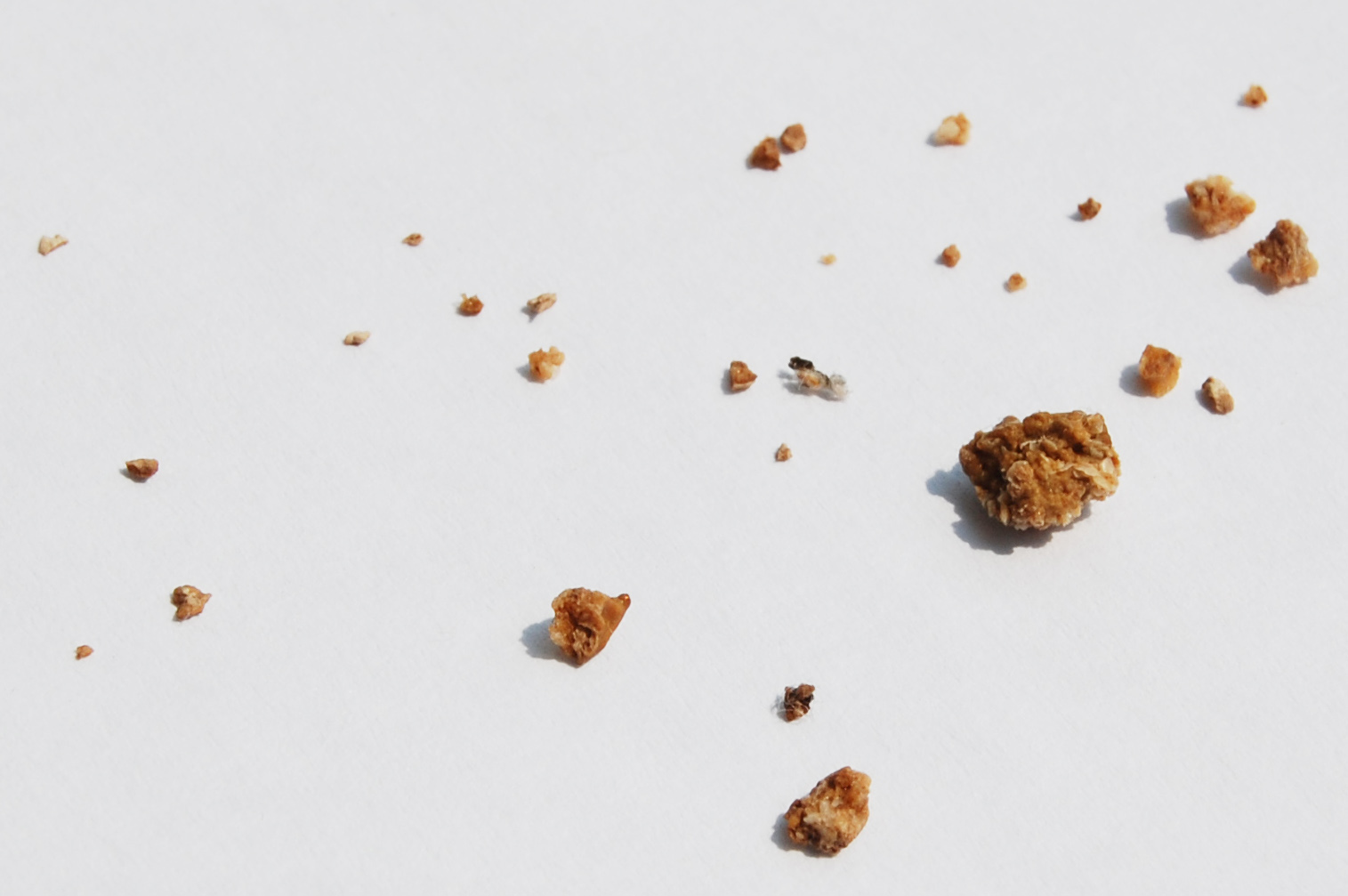
Calcium oxalate (a type of kidney stone) fragments collected after treatment with lithotripsy.

Extracorporeal Shockwave Therapy

- Extracorporeal shockwave therapy involves focused, high-energy ultrasound pulses that can be used to break solid masses into fragments. This is often utilized to break up calculi such as kidney stones and gallstones into pieces small enough to be passed from the body without undue difficulty, a procedure known as lithotripsy. The success of lithotripsy depends on the size and location of the stone, and the patient's age.

Oncology

- Ultrasound can ablate tumors or other tissue non-invasively. This is accomplished using a technique known as high intensity focused ultrasound (HIFU), also called focused ultrasound surgery. This procedure uses generally lower frequencies than medical diagnostic ultrasound (250–2000 kHz), but significantly higher time-averaged intensities. The treatment is often guided by magnetic resonance imaging (MRI); the combination is then referred to as magnetic resonance-guided focused ultrasound. In the clinical setting, HIFU techniques are currently being investigated to treat liver, kidney, and prostatic tumors.

Ophthalmology

- Focused ultrasound sources may be used for cataract treatment by phacoemulsification in which the internal lens of the eye is broken down into small pieces that may then be aspirated. HIFU can also be used in ophthalmology to treat glaucoma. This is accomplished by targeting the ultrasound beams to ablate the ciliary body.

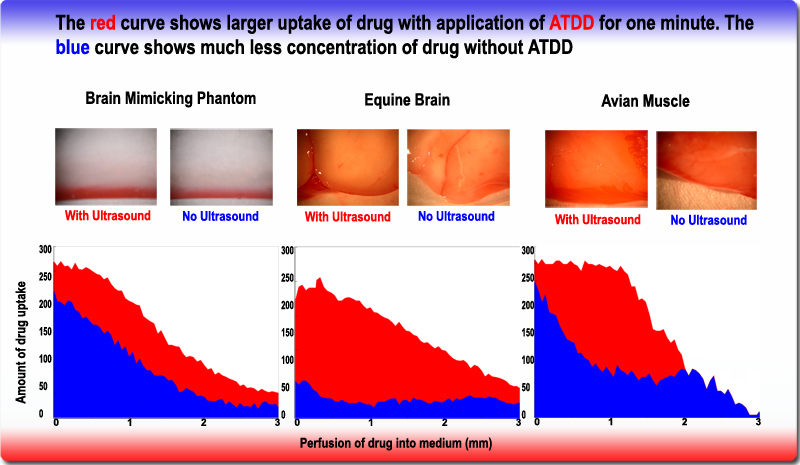
Enhanced drug uptake using acoustic targeted drug delivery

Drug Delivery

- Delivering chemotherapy to brain cancer cells and various drugs to other tissues is called acoustic targeted drug delivery. These procedures generally use high frequency ultrasound (1–10 MHz) and a range of intensities (0–20 W/cm^{2}). The acoustic energy is focused on the tissue of interest to agitate the cellular matrix and make it more permeable for therapeutic drugs.
- Ultrasound has been used to trigger the release of anti-cancer drugs from delivery vectors including liposomes, polymeric microspheres and self-assembled polymeric.
- Phonophoresis is a form of soft tissue treatment that involves the use of ultrasound combined with medication gels to enhance drug delivery to the desired area.

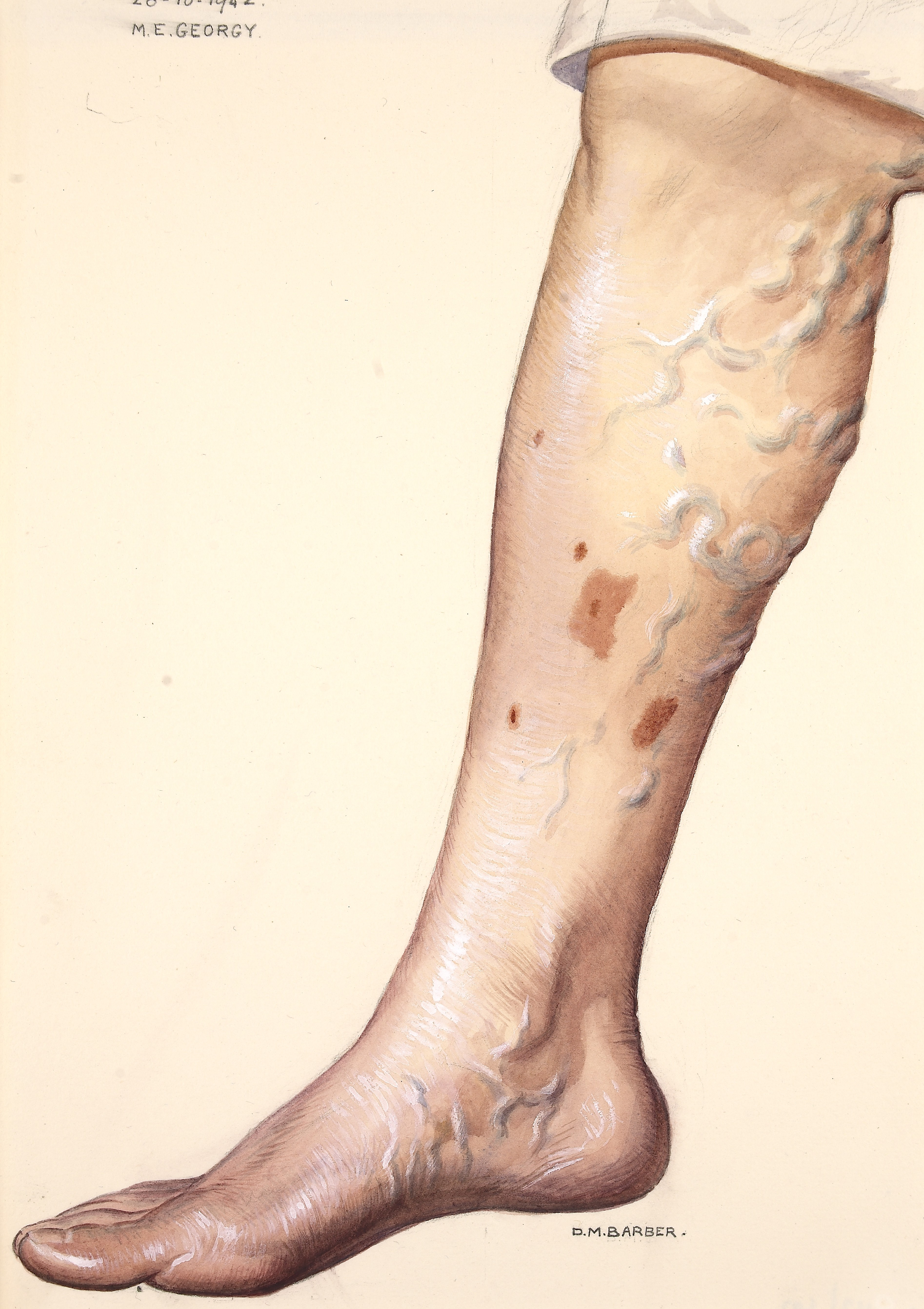
Shown in this picture are varicose veins that would be targeted with ultrasound-guided sclerotherapy.

Vascular Surgery

- Ultrasound is essential to the procedures of ultrasound-guided sclerotherapy and endovenous laser treatment for the non-surgical treatment of varicose veins. Ultrasound-guided sclerotherapy techniques are also used to treat ovarian endometriomas, especially for patients who are pregnant.

Plastic Surgery

- Ultrasound-assisted lipectomy involves the use of ultrasound to aid in removal of subcutaneous fat during liposuction procedures. Highly focused ultrasound waves are used to emulsify fat cells and allow for easier removal with suction.

== History ==
The first large scale application of ultrasound was around World War II. Sonar systems were being built and used to navigate submarines. It was realized that the high intensity ultrasound waves that they were using were heating and killing fish. This led to research in tissue heating and healing effects. Since the 1940s, ultrasound has been used by physical and occupational therapists for therapeutic effects.

== Physical therapy ==
Ultrasound is applied using a transducer or applicator that is in direct contact with the patient's skin. Gel is used on all surfaces of the head to reduce friction and assist transmission of the ultrasonic waves. Therapeutic ultrasound in physical therapy is alternating compression and rarefaction of sound waves with a frequency of 0.7 to 3.3 MHz. Maximum energy absorption in soft tissue occurs from 2 to 5 cm. Intensity decreases as the waves penetrate deeper. They are absorbed primarily by connective tissue: ligaments, tendons, and fascia (and also by scar tissue).

Ultrasound has been used to help physical therapists navigate transcutaneous modalities that aim to stimulate specific muscles beneath the skin; modalities such as dry needling and acupuncture. The use of ultrasound provides a way for physical therapists to better locate superficial musculature. Conditions for which ultrasound may be used for treatment include the following examples: ligament sprains, muscle strains, tendonitis, joint inflammation, plantar fasciitis, metatarsalgia, facet irritation, impingement syndrome, bursitis, rheumatoid arthritis, osteoarthritis, and scar tissue adhesion. There is no evidence to support the use of ultrasound for the treatment of low back pain, and current clinical guidelines recommend that ultrasound is not used for this condition. In a critical review, it was demonstrated that therapeutic ultrasound was effective in improving pain, function, and cartilage repair in knee osteoarthritis. Another systematic review and meta-analysis of low-intensity pulsed ultrasound on knee osteoarthritis demonstrated a significant effect on pain reduction and knee functional recovery. Ultrasound used for calcific tendonitis had a positive short term effect. For the long term, there was no significant difference with ultrasound use. This shows that for pain relief and short-term treatment ultrasound can be an effective treatment for Calcific Tendonitis A review with five small placebo‐controlled trials from 2011, did not support the use of ultrasound in the treatment of acute ankle sprains and the potential treatment effects of ultrasound appear to be generally small and of probably of limited clinical importance, especially in the context of the usually short‐term recovery period for these injuries. However, therapeutic ultrasound is reported to have beneficial effects in sports injuries pain relief, edema control, and range of joint motion, possibly by increasing pain thresholds, collagen extensibility, reducing edema, and therefore inflammation, muscle spasms, and joint stiffness. A meta-analysis found that ultrasound therapy is effective in reducing pain, increasing ROM, and reducing WOMAC functional scores in patients with knee osteoarthritis.

There are three potential therapeutic mechanisms of ultrasound in physical therapy. The first is the increase in blood flow in the treated area. The second is the decrease in pain from the reduction of swelling and edema. The third is the gentle massage of muscle tendons and ligaments in the treated area because no strain is added and existing scar tissue may be softened with ultrasound. These three benefits are achieved by two main effects of therapeutic ultrasound: thermal and non-thermal effects. Thermal effects are due to the absorption of the sound waves and result in heating of biological tissue. Non-thermal effects are from cavitation, microstreaming and acoustic streaming.

Cavitation is the main non-thermal effect of therapeutic ultrasound. Cavitation results from the vibration of tissue causing microscopic bubbles to form. These microscopic bubbles may directly stimulate cell membranes and cause shockwaves within the tissue. This physical stimulation appears to enhance the cell-repair effects of the inflammatory response.

== Knee osteoarthritis ==
According to recent research, therapeutic ultrasound has not shown any significant improvement for chronic low back pain, chronic neck pain, and hip pain in combination with other physiotherapeutic techniques. However, the most conclusive evidence to support therapeutic ultrasound use is seen with its use in patients with knee osteoarthritis. Knee osteoarthritis affects approximately 250 million people worldwide. While there is no known cure, therapeutic regimens are often used to intervene with the diseases chronic symptoms. In a systematic review of 15 studies, patients who received ultrasound treatments were compared to those who received a placebo treatment. The evidence demonstrated that therapeutic ultrasound significantly relieved pain, increases range of motion, and reduced WOMAC functional scores in patients with knee osteoarthritis when compared to the placebo group. In a separate meta-analysis, it reinforced the use of therapeutic ultrasound by deeming it as a safe non-pharmacological treatment option that may provide additional pain relief as well as functional improvement when used secondarily to therapy in patients with knee osteoarthritis.

== Research into applications ==
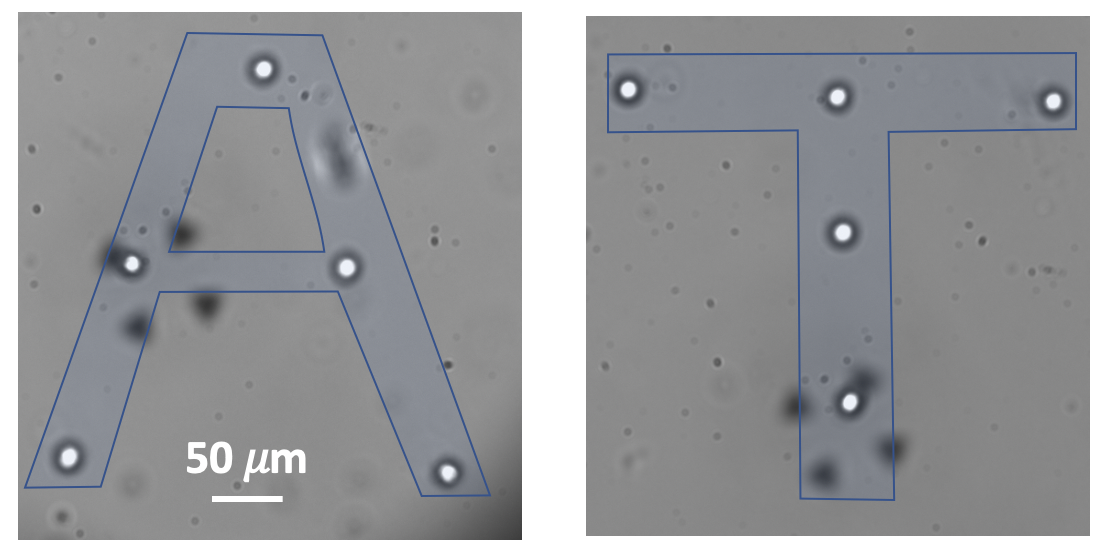
Acoustic tweezers sorted ten cells into the shape of the letters "A" and "T" at a scale of micrometers.

Research Tools

- Acoustic tweezers is an emerging tool for contactless separation, concentration and manipulation of microparticles and biological cells, using ultrasound in the low MHz range to form standing waves. This is based on the acoustic radiation force which causes particles to be attracted to either the or anti-nodes of the standing wave depending on the acoustic contrast factor, which is a function of the sound velocities and densities of the particle and of the medium in which the particle is immersed.
- Application of focused ultrasound in conjunction with microbubbles has been shown to enable non-invasive delivery of epirubicin across the blood–brain barrier in mouse models and non-invasive delivery of GABA in non human primates.

Biophysical Effects of Ultrasound

- Using ultrasound to generate cellular effects in soft tissue has fallen out of favor as research has shown a lack of efficacy and a lack of scientific basis for proposed biophysical effects.
- According to a 2017 meta-analysis and associated practice guideline, low intensity pulsed ultrasound should no longer been used for bone regeneration because high quality clinical studies failed to demonstrate a clinical benefit.

Enhancing Drug Delivery

- An additional effect of low-intensity ultrasound could be its potential to disrupt the blood–brain barrier for drug delivery.
- Transcranial ultrasound is being tested for use in aiding tissue plasminogen activator treatment in stroke patients in the procedure called ultrasound-enhanced systemic thrombolysis.
- Ultrasound has been shown to act synergistically with antibiotics in killing bacteria.

Musculoskeletal Research

- Long-duration therapeutic ultrasound called sustained acoustic medicine is a daily slow-release therapy that can be applied to increase local circulation and theoretically accelerates healing of musculoskeletal tissues after an injury. However, there is some evidence to suggest this may not be effective.
- Ultrasound has been shown to contribute to improvement of muscular strength of the forearm muscles and humerus muscles and an increase in range of motion in the elbow joint in flexion and outward rotation when accompanied with therapeutic exercise as well as a reduction in pain in men ages 30–40 with tendinitis

== See also ==
- Home ultrasound
- LILFU
