= Service Description Table =

Metadata used in Digital Video Broadcasting

Service Description Table (SDT) is a metadata table used in Digital Video Broadcasting systems to describe the television, radio or other services contained in MPEG transport streams provided by the system. The purpose and format of the table is defined in ETSI EN 300 468: Specification for Service Information (SI) in DVB systems.

An MPEG transport stream consists of a sequence of packets. SDTs are contained in packets identified by the packet ID (PID) 0x0011. Such packets may alternatively contain a Bouquet Association Table (BAT) or a Stuffing Table (ST). The type of information carried in the packet is identified using a table ID. The table ID 0x42 identifies the SDT providing information about services contained in the same transport stream as the SDT itself. The table ID 0x46 identifies SDTs providing information about services contained in other transport streams in the same network or system.

The SDT provides the following information about each service:

- the transport stream id.
- the service id.
- whether or not programme schedules are provided in the transport stream.
- whether or not there is information about the current and next programmes.
- the running status of the service (e.g. starting soon, paused, running or off-air).
- whether or not the service is scrambled.

Further optional information may be provided about each service, such as the name of the service, the name of the broadcaster responsible for the service, service availability or service authority url.
