= Packetized elementary stream =

Specification of the MPEG-2 standard

Packetized Elementary Stream (PES) is a specification in the MPEG-2 Part 1 (Systems) (ISO/IEC 13818-1) and ITU-T H.222.0 that defines carrying of elementary streams (usually the output of an audio or video encoder) in packets within MPEG program streams and MPEG transport streams. The elementary stream is packetized by encapsulating sequential data bytes from the elementary stream inside PES packet headers.

A typical method of transmitting elementary stream data from a video or audio encoder is to first create PES packets from the elementary stream data and then to encapsulate these PES packets inside Transport Stream (TS) packets or Program Stream (PS) packets. The TS packets can then be multiplexed and transmitted using broadcasting techniques, such as those used in an ATSC and DVB.

Transport Streams and Program Streams are each logically constructed from PES packets. PES packets shall be used to convert between Transport Streams and Program Streams. In some cases the PES packets need not be modified when performing such conversions. PES packets may be much larger than the size of a Transport Stream packet.

== PES packet header ==
Name	Size	Description
Packet start code prefix	3 bytes	0x000001
Stream id	1 byte	Examples: Audio streams (0xC0-0xDF), Video streams (0xE0-0xEF)
		Note: The above 4 bytes is called the 32 bit start code.
PES Packet length	2 bytes	Specifies the number of bytes remaining in the packet after this field. Can be zero. If the PES packet length is set to zero, the PES packet can be of any length. A value of zero for the PES packet length can be used only when the PES packet payload is a video elementary stream.
Optional PES header	variable length (length >= 3)	not present in case of Padding stream & Private stream 2 (navigation data)
Data		See elementary stream. In the case of private streams the first byte of the payload is the sub-stream number.

=== Optional PES header ===
Name	Number of Bits	Description
Marker bits	2	10 binary or 0x2 hex
Scrambling control	2	00 implies not scrambled
Priority	1	
Data alignment indicator	1	1 indicates that the PES packet header is immediately followed by the video start code or audio syncword
Copyright	1	1 implies copyrighted
Original or Copy	1	1 implies original
PTS DTS indicator	2	11 = both present, 01 is forbidden, 10 = only PTS, 00 = no PTS or DTS
ESCR flag	1	
ES rate flag	1	
DSM trick mode flag	1	
Additional copy info flag	1	
CRC flag	1	
extension flag	1	
PES header length	8	gives the length of the remainder of the PES header in bytes
Optional fields	variable length	presence is determined by flag bits above
Stuffing Bytes	variable length	0xff

While above flags indicate that values are appended into variable length optional fields, they are not just simply written out. For example, PTS (and DTS) is expanded from 33 bits to 5 bytes (40 bits). If only PTS is present, this is done by catenating 0010b, most significant 3 bits from PTS, 1, following next 15 bits, 1, rest 15 bits and 1. If both PTS and DTS are present the same is done, but first 4 bits before start of PTS bits are 0011b (and not 0010b) and first 4 bits before start of DTS bits are 0001b. Other appended bytes have similar but different encoding.
