= Transcranial pulsed ultrasound =

Transcranial pulsed ultrasound (TPU) uses low intensity, low frequency ultrasound (LILFU) to stimulate the brain. In 2002, Dr. Alexander Bystritsky first proposed the idea that this methodology contained therapeutic benefits. Beginning in 2008, Dr. William Tyler and his research team from Arizona State University began an investigation and development of this alternative neuromodulation without the harmful effects and risks of invasive surgery. They discovered that this low-power ultrasound is able to stimulate high neuron activity which allows for the manipulation of the brain waves through an external source. Unlike deep brain stimulation or Vagus nerve stimulation, which use implants and electrical impulses, TPU is a noninvasive and focused procedure that does not require the implantation of electrodes that could damage the nervous tissue. Its use is applicable in the various fields including but not limited to medical and military science. Although this technology holds great potential to introducing new and beneficial alternatives to conventional brain manipulation, it is a relatively young science and has certain obstructions to its full development such as a lack of complete understanding and control of every safety measure.

== Research and applications ==
Most of the research as of 2010 revolved around projects to utilize TPU as a method of treating neural disorders and improving cognitive function. However, in 2012 Dr. Tyler also began research on ultrasound's potential to stopping seizures. Dr. Tyler and his team still continue to improve their knowledge of brain stimulation therapy and hope to provide a strong foundation in the implementation of such methods.

=== Medical field ===
Scientists continue to test a variety of mammals such as humans, monkeys and mice on positively affecting the treatment of epilepsy, Parkinson's disease, chronic pain, coma, dystonia, psychoses and depression by applying safe, low-intensity, TPU. Because the potential for this technology covers a wide variety of benefits, continued research into its safety and efficacy is expected to accelerate its integration into standard medical practice.

=== Military ===
Defense Advanced Research Projects Agency (DARPA) is undergoing research to develop a helmet that could control the mental stress of soldiers through the use of TPU. It could have the potential to moderate a soldier's stress and anxiety levels. Sound waves would target specific areas of the brain to stimulate activity in regions only a few cubic millimeters in size. This would allow them to target very specific areas of the brain with great accuracy and without inflicting damage to its surroundings. A prototype of this device is currently being worked upon to better the ability and potential of soldiers.

== Testing ==
Conventional ultrasound used for anatomical analysis typically uses a wave frequency of about 20 MHz to penetrate the bodily tissue and produce images. In comparison, the low frequency of TPU has a sub-thermal exposure of about 5.7 MHz. By significantly reducing the wave frequency, excitable tissue can be manipulated without overexposure or detectable damage. Scientists have discovered that focusing on targeted brain regions in animals has been proven to alter their behavior, their cells' electrical properties (electrophysiology), and their synaptic plasticity, which is essentially the neuron's ability to function.

For instance, when focused on the motor cortex of mice, TPU has been shown to induce paw movements without changing the structure or function of that area of the brain. This proves that this method is capable of controlling brain activity at a high cognitive level. It is clear that shorter waves are able to activate neuron activity while longer waves inhibit it. However, the mechanism responsible for this reaction is yet to be discovered. A recent leading hypothesis is the mechanical manipulation of stretch-sensitive membranes actually stimulates certain voltage-gated ion channels, such as sodium or calcium, thus modulating neuronal activity.

== Limitations ==
Clinical trials have been used to determine any outstanding harmful effects. Although no subjects have displayed long-term neurological abnormalities as a result of these tests, this is a relatively new procedure and has not been studied enough to predict long term side effects. Even though it is a safer alternative to surgery because it is non-invasive, ultrasound always holds the potential to unintentionally disarrange the neurons in a harmful way and cause minor hemorrhages after long-term exposure.

== Therapeutic benefits ==
Opposing high-frequency ultrasound, LILFU holds the following benefits: lower absorption in tissue, greater physical penetration depth in tissue, stronger particle deflections, significantly better acoustic penetration and power in bone, greater influence in kinetic effects, immediate/short-term effect results, longer/persistent effects after procedure and a higher degree of patient safety.

There has been evidence provided for ultrasound neuromodulation's potential in treating chronic pain and similar conditions. After 31 patients with chronic pain had 8 MHz unfocused transcranial ultrasound stimulation targeted to the posterior frontal cortex in a double-blind, sham-controlled study, they reported feeling in a better mood 10 to 40 minutes after having received the treatment. Due to time constraints, these tests are not necessarily extensive enough to provide conclusive evidence in regard to the treatment's effect on general mental wellbeing.
