= MPEG transport stream =

Digital video format used for storage network transmission

MPEG Transport Stream
- Filename extension: .ts, .tsv, .tsa, .m2t
- Internet media type: video/MP2T
- Uniform Type Identifier (UTI): public.mpeg-2-transport-stream
- Developed by: MPEG
- Initial release: 10 July 1995; 30 years ago
- Latest release: ISO/IEC 13818-1:2022; September 2022; 3 years ago
- Type of format: Container format
- Container for: Audio, video, data
- Extended to: M2TS, TOD
- Standard: ISO/IEC 13818-1, ITU-T Recommendation H.222.0
- Open format?: Yes
- Free format?: Yes

MPEG transport stream (MPEG-TS, MTS) or simply transport stream (TS) is a standard digital container format for transmission and storage of audio, video, and Program and System Information Protocol (PSIP) data. It is used in broadcast systems such as DVB, ATSC and IPTV.

Transport stream specifies a container format encapsulating packetized elementary streams, with error correction and synchronization pattern features for maintaining transmission integrity when the communication channel carrying the stream is degraded.

Transport streams differ from the similarly named MPEG program stream in several important ways: program streams are designed for reasonably reliable media, such as discs (like DVDs), while transport streams are designed for less reliable transmission, namely terrestrial or satellite broadcast. Further, a transport stream may carry multiple programs.

Transport stream is specified in MPEG-2 Part 1, Systems, formally known as ISO/IEC standard 13818-1 or ITU-T Rec. H.222.0.

== Overview ==
Multiple MPEG programs are combined then sent to a transmitting antenna. The receiver parses and decodes one of the streams.

A transport stream encapsulates a number of other substreams, often packetized elementary streams (PESs) which in turn wrap the main data stream using the MPEG codec or any number of non-MPEG codecs (such as AC3 or DTS audio, and MJPEG or JPEG 2000 video), text and pictures for subtitles, tables identifying the streams, and even broadcaster-specific information such as an electronic program guide. Many streams are often mixed together, such as several different television channels, or multiple angles of a movie.

Each stream is chopped into (at most) 188-byte sections and interleaved together. Due to the tiny packet size, streams can be interleaved with less latency and greater error resilience compared to program streams and other common containers such as AVI, MOV/MP4, and MKV, which generally wrap each frame into one packet. This is particularly important for videoconferencing, where large frames may introduce unacceptable audio delay.

Transport streams tend to be broadcast as constant bitrate (CBR) and filled with padding bytes when not enough data exists. (Note: The Blu-ray format does not require CBR.)

== Elements ==
=== Packet ===
A network packet is the basic unit of data in a transport stream, and a transport stream is merely a sequence of packets. Each packet starts with a sync byte and a header, which may be followed by optional additional headers; the rest of the packet consists of payload. All header fields are read as big-endian. Packets are 188 bytes in length, but the communication medium may add additional information. (Note: Forward error correction is added by ISDB and DVB (16 bytes) and ATSC (20 bytes), while the M2TS format prefixes packets with a 4-byte copyright and timestamp tag.) The 188-byte packet size was originally chosen for compatibility with Asynchronous Transfer Mode (ATM) systems.

Partial transport stream packet format
Name	Number of bits	Bitmask (big-endian)	Description
4-byte Transport Stream Header
Sync byte	8	0xff000000	Bit pattern of 0x47 (ASCII char 'G')
Transport error indicator (TEI)	1	0x800000	Set when a demodulator can't correct errors from FEC data; indicating the packet is corrupt.
Payload unit start indicator (PUSI)	1	0x400000	Set when this packet contains the first byte of a new payload unit. For PSI packet data, the first byte of the payload will indicate where this new payload unit starts. For PES packet data, the new PES packet shall start at the start of the payload. This field allows a receiver that started reading mid transmission to know when it can start extracting data.
Transport priority	1	0x200000	Set when the current packet has a higher priority than other packets with the same PID.
PID	13	0x1fff00	Packet Identifier, describing the payload data.
Transport scrambling control (TSC)	2	0xc0	'00' = Not scrambled. For DVB-CSA and ATSC DES only: '01' (0x40) = Reserved for future use '10' (0x80) = Scrambled with even key '11' (0xC0) = Scrambled with odd key
Adaptation field control	2	0x30	01 – no adaptation field, payload only, 10 – adaptation field only, no payload, 11 – adaptation field followed by payload, 00 – RESERVED for future use
Continuity counter	4	0xf	Sequence number of payload packets (0x00 to 0x0F) within each stream (except PID 8191); Incremented per-PID, only when a payload flag is set.
Optional fields
Adaptation field	variable		Present if adaptation field control is 10 or 11. See below for format.
Payload data	variable		Present if adaptation field control is 01 or 11. Payload may be PES packets, program specific information (below), or other data.

Adaptation field format
Name	Number of bits	Bitmask	Description
Adaptation field length	8		Number of bytes in the adaptation field immediately following this byte
Discontinuity indicator	1	0x80	Set if current TS packet is in a discontinuity state with respect to either the continuity counter or the program clock reference
Random access indicator	1	0x40	Set when the stream may be decoded without errors from this point
Elementary stream priority indicator	1	0x20	Set when this stream should be considered "high priority"
PCR flag	1	0x10	Set when PCR field is present
OPCR flag	1	0x08	Set when OPCR field is present
Splicing point flag	1	0x04	Set when splice countdown field is present
Transport private data flag	1	0x02	Set when transport private data is present
Adaptation field extension flag	1	0x01	Set when adaptation extension data is present
Optional fields
PCR	48		Program clock reference, stored as 33 bits base, 6 bits reserved, 9 bits extension. The value is calculated as base * 300 + extension.
OPCR	48		Original Program clock reference. Helps when one TS is copied into another
Splice countdown	8		Indicates how many TS packets from this one a splicing point occurs (Two's complement signed; may be negative)
Transport private data length	8		The length of the following field
Transport private data	variable		Private data
Adaptation extension	variable		See below
Stuffing bytes	variable		Always 0xFF

Adaptation extension format
Name	Number of bits	Bitmask	Description
Adaptation extension length	8	0xff00	The length of the header
Legal time window (LTW) flag	1	0x0080	
Piecewise rate flag	1	0x0040	
Seamless splice flag	1	0x0020	
Reserved	5	0x001f	
Optional fields
LTW flag set (2 bytes)
LTW valid flag	1	0x8000	
LTW offset	15	0x7fff	Extra information for rebroadcasters to determine the state of buffers when packets may be missing.
Piecewise flag set (3 bytes)
Reserved	2	0xc00000	
Piecewise rate	22	0x3fffff	The rate of the stream, measured in 188-byte packets, to define the end-time of the LTW.
Seamless splice flag set (5 bytes)
Splice type	4	0xf000000000	Indicates the parameters of the H.262 splice.
DTS next access unit	36	0x0efffefffe	The PES DTS of the splice point. Split up as multiple fields, 1 marker bit (0x1), 15 bits, 1 marker bit, 15 bits, and 1 marker bit, for 33 data bits total.

Payload format
Name	Number of bits	Bitmask	Description
Payload Pointer (optional)	8	0xff	Present only if the Payload Unit Start Indicator (PUSI) flag is set, and the packet data type is PSI (not PES). It gives the index after this byte at which the new payload unit starts. Any payload byte before the index is part of the previous payload unit.
Actual Payload	variable		The content of the payload.

=== Packet identifier (PID) ===
Each table or elementary stream in a transport stream is identified by a 13-bit packet identifier (PID). A demultiplexer extracts elementary streams from the transport stream in part by looking for packets identified by the same PID. In most applications, time-division multiplexing will be used to decide how often a particular PID appears in the transport stream.

Packet identifiers in use
Decimal	Hexadecimal	Description
0	0x0000	Program association table (PAT) contains a directory listing of all program map tables
1	0x0001	Conditional access table (CAT) contains a directory listing of all ITU-T Rec. H.222 entitlement management message streams used by program map tables
2	0x0002	Transport stream description table (TSDT) contains descriptors relating to the overall transport stream
3	0x0003	IPMP control information table contains a directory listing of all ISO/IEC 14496-13 control streams used by program map tables
4–15	0x0004-0x000F	Reserved for future use
16–31	0x0010-0x001F	Used by DVB metadata: 0x0010: NIT, ST; 0x0011: SDT, BAT, ST; 0x0012: EIT, ST, CIT; 0x0013: RST, ST; 0x0014: TDT, TOT, ST; 0x0015: network synchronization; 0x0016: RNT; 0x0017-0x001B: reserved for future use; 0x001C: inband signalling; 0x001D: measurement; 0x001E: DIT; 0x001F: SIT
32-8186	0x0020-0x1FFA	May be assigned as needed to program map tables, elementary streams and other data tables
8187	0x1FFB	Used by DigiCipher 2/ATSC MGT metadata
8188–8190	0x1FFC-0x1FFE	May be assigned as needed to program map tables, elementary streams and other data tables
8191	0x1FFF	Null Packet (used for fixed bandwidth padding)

=== Programs ===
Transport stream has a concept of programs. Every program is described by a program map table (PMT). The elementary streams associated with that program have PIDs listed in the PMT. Another PID is associated with the PMT itself. For instance, a transport stream used in digital television might contain three programs to represent three television channels. Suppose each channel consists of one video stream, one or two audio streams, and any necessary metadata. A receiver wishing to decode one of the three channels merely has to decode the payloads of each PID associated with its program. It can discard the contents of all other PIDs. A transport stream with more than one program is referred to as a multi-program transport stream (MPTS). A single program transport stream is referred to as a single-program transport stream (SPTS).

=== Program specific information ===
There are 4 program-specific information (PSI) tables: program association (PAT), program map (PMT), conditional access (CAT), and network information (NIT). The MPEG-2 specification does not specify the format of the CAT and NIT.

=== PCR ===
To enable a decoder to present synchronized content, such as audio tracks matching the associated video, at least once each 100 ms, a program clock reference (PCR) is transmitted in the adaptation field of an MPEG-2 transport stream packet. The PID with the PCR for an MPEG-2 program is identified by the pcr_pid value in the associated PMT. The value of the PCR, when properly used, is employed to generate a system_timing_clock in the decoder. The system time clock (STC) decoder, when properly implemented, provides a highly accurate time base that is used to synchronize audio and video elementary streams. Timing in MPEG-2 references this clock. For example, the presentation time stamp (PTS) is intended to be relative to the PCR. The first 33 bits are based on a 90 kHz clock. The last 9 bits are based on a 27 MHz clock. The maximum jitter permitted for the PCR is +/- 500 ns.

=== Null packets ===
Some transmission schemes, such as those in ATSC and DVB, impose strict constant bitrate requirements on the transport stream. In order to ensure that the stream maintains a constant bitrate, a multiplexer may need to insert some additional packets. The PID 0x1FFF is reserved for this purpose. The null packets have a payload that is filled with 0xFF, and the receiver is expected to ignore its contents.

== M2TS ==
Transport Stream was originally designed for broadcast. Later, it was adapted for use with digital video cameras, recorders and players by adding a 4-byte timecode (TC) field to the standard 188-byte packets, resulting in a 192-byte packet. This is what is informally called M2TS stream, commonly found in HDV cameras. The timecode allows quick access to any part of the stream, either from a media player or from a non-linear video editing system.

=== Use in digital video cameras ===
JVC called M2TS "TOD" (Note: Possibly an abbreviation for "Transport stream on disc".) when used in HDD-based camcorders like GZ-HD7. It is also used to synchronize video streams from several cameras in a multiple-camera setup.

=== Use in Blu-ray ===
Blu-ray Disc video titles authored with menu support are in the Blu-ray Disc Movie (BDMV) format and contain audio, video, and other streams in a BDAV container, which is based on the M2TS format. The Blu-ray Disc Association calls it "BDAV MPEG-2 transport stream". Blu-ray Disc video uses these modified MPEG-2 transport streams, compared to DVD's program streams that don't have the extra transport overhead.

There is also the BDAV (Blu-ray Disc Audio/Visual) format, the consumer-oriented alternative to the BDMV format used for movie releases. The BDAV format is used on Blu-ray Disc recordable for audio/video recording. (Note: Filename extension .m2ts is used on Blu-ray Disc video files which contain an incompatible BDAV MPEG-2 transport stream due to the four additional octets added to every packet.) Blu-ray Disc employs the MPEG-2 transport stream recording method. This enables transport streams of a BDAV converted digital broadcast to be recorded as they are with minimal alteration of the packets. It also enables simple stream cut style editing of a BDAV converted digital broadcast that is recorded as is and where the data can be edited just by discarding unwanted packets from the stream. Although it is quite natural, a function for high-speed and easy-to-use retrieval is built in.

== See also ==
- MPEG media transport (MMT)
- Real-time Transport Protocol (RTP)
- Unidirectional Lightweight Encapsulation (ULE)
