= Sonodynamic therapy =

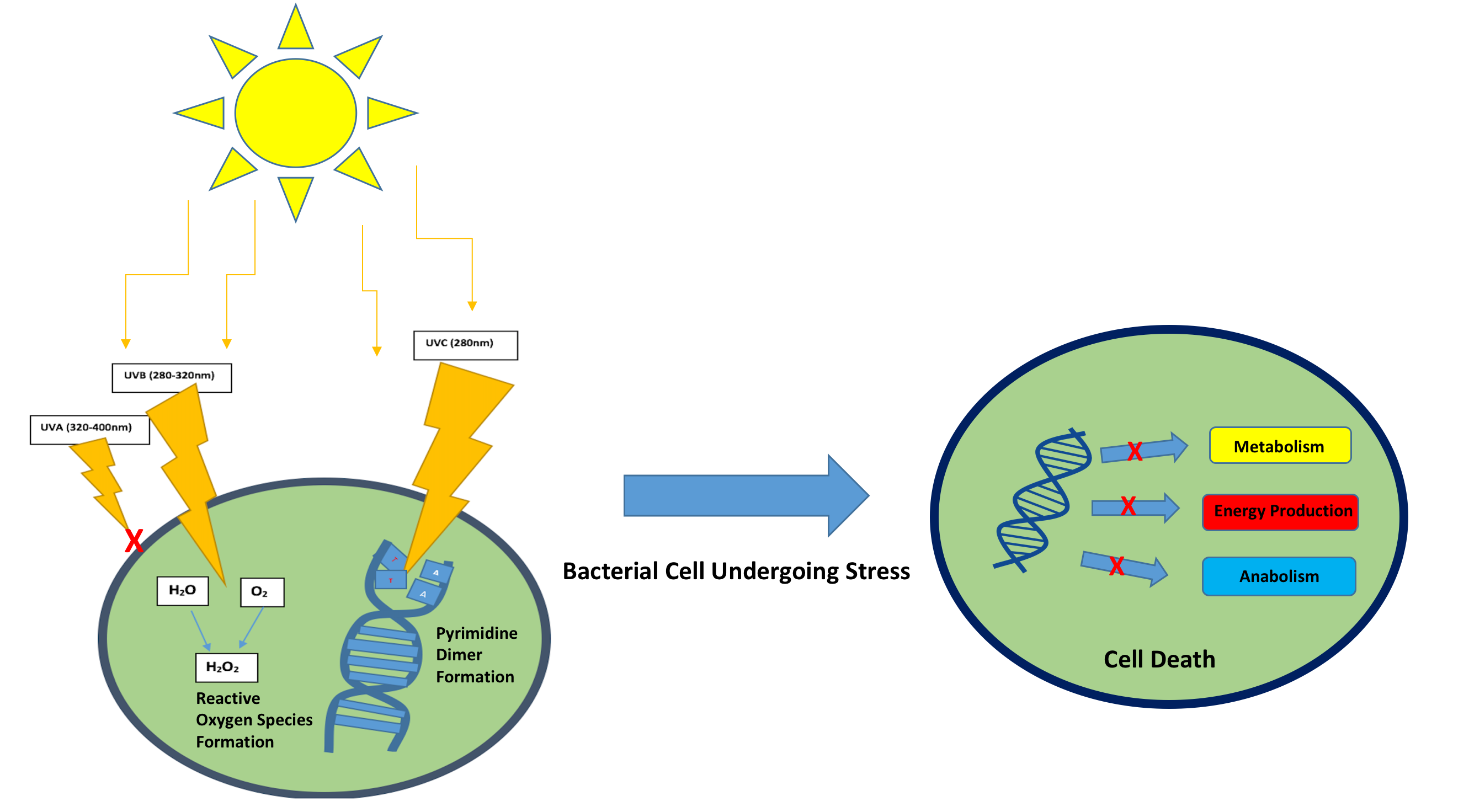
UV Radiation

Sonodynamic therapy (SDT) is a noninvasive treatment, often used for tumor irradiation, that utilizes a sonosensitizer and the deep penetration of ultrasound to treat lesions of varying depths by reducing target cell number and preventing future tumor growth. Many existing cancer treatment strategies cause systemic toxicity or cannot penetrate tissue deep enough to reach the entire tumor; however, emerging ultrasound stimulated therapies could offer an alternative to these treatments with their increased efficiency, greater penetration depth, and reduced side effects. Sonodynamic therapy could be used to treat cancers and other diseases, such as atherosclerosis, and diminish the risk associated with other treatment strategies since it induces cytotoxic effects only when externally stimulated by ultrasound and only at the cancerous region, as opposed to the systemic administration of chemotherapy drugs.

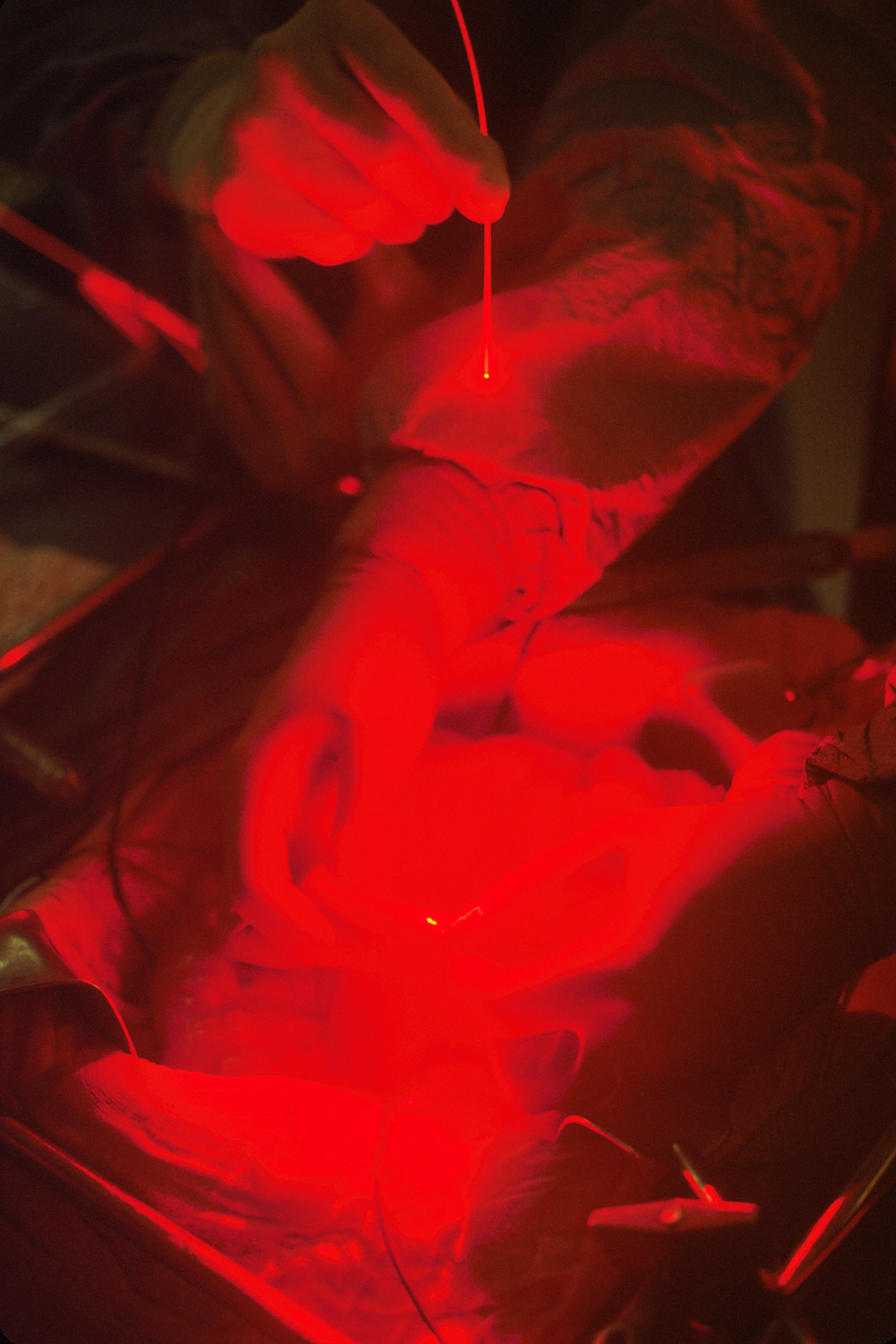
Photodynamic Therapy

Reactive oxygen species (ROS) are an essential component of SDT as they provide the cytotoxicity of sonodynamic therapy; they are produced when ultrasound is coupled with a sensitizing drug and molecular oxygen. Without ultrasound, the drug is not toxic. However, once the drug is exposed to ultrasound and molecular oxygen, it becomes toxic. Photodynamic therapy, from which sonodynamic therapy was derived, uses a similar mechanism. Instead of ultrasound, light is used to activate the drug. SDT allows the ultrasound to reach deeper into the tissue (to about 30 centimeters) compared to photodynamic therapy (PDT) since it can be highly focused. This increased penetration depth ultimately means that SDT can be utilized to treat deeper, less accessible tumors and is more cost-effective than PDT. Photodynamic therapy can be used in combination with sonodynamic therapy and is expanded upon in the Applications section of this article. Sonodynamic therapy can be used synergistically with other therapeutic methods such as drug-loaded microbubbles, nanoparticles, exosomes, liposomes, and genes for improved efficacy. Currently, SDT does not have any clinical products and acts as an adjuvant for the aforementioned therapeutic methods, but it has been explored for use in atherosclerosis and cancer treatment to reduce tumor size in breast, pancreas, liver, and spinal sarcomas.

== Mechanism of Action ==
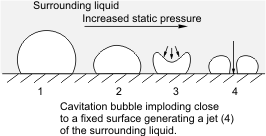
Cavitation bubble implosion

The mechanism of action for sonodynamic therapy is the use of low-intensity ultrasound through the use of focused mechanical waves to create a cytotoxic effect. However, SDT itself is non-thermal, non-toxic, and is able to non-invasively penetrate deep into tissue compared to other delivery methods such as photodynamic therapy. SDT is often performed alongside the use of a sonosensitizer such as porphyrin, phthalocyanines, xanthenes, and antitumor drugs. Ultrasound waves are also classified as acoustic waves, and the effect they have on the tissue of application can be described by a process called cavitation. Cavitation occurs as a specific interaction between ultrasound and aqueous surroundings and causes gas bubbles to break upon exposure to particular ultrasonic parameters, thus promoting penetration of the therapeutic into the biological tissues by generating cavities near the edge of the membrane. Cavitation can be broken down into stable and inertial cavitation. In stable cavitation, the oscillation of gas bubbles causes the environmental media to intermix. In inertial cavitation, gas bubbles increase in volume and almost reach their resonance volume, swelling before aggressively collapsing. The implosion of vesicles results in a drastic temperature and pressure change, thereby increasing the cell membrane's permeability to various drugs. Microbubbles are created by the acoustic waves from the ultrasound that expand and collapse, releasing energy, bringing the sonosensitizer into an excited state, and generating a ROS. The cavitation of this gas bubble can form the ROS with different methodologies such as sonoluminescence and pyrolysis. Apoptosis results from the formation of ROS and mechanical forces of SDT through membrane disruption in a process called lipid peroxidation. Necrosis is also a potential result of SDT.

The influence of sonoluminescence on SDT and ROS has not been fully elaborated within literature. Currently, it is understood that sonoluminescence allows the emission of light upon bubble collapse which can activate sensitizers. A study by Hachimine et al. highlights the use of SDT as a method to activate a low photosensitive sonosensitizer, DCPH-P-Na(I), for cancer that is too deep within the tissue to combat utilizing PDT without skin irritation. Pyrolysis raises the surrounding temperature, enhances the cavitation process, breaks down the sensitizer, generating free radicals, and the free radicals interact within their environment to generate ROS. For both methods, the importance of the singlet oxygen compared to the hydroxyl radical to induce cytotoxicity has been highlighted. While other studies have found the singlet oxygen to not have a substantial effect. Overall, both of these methodologies lack significant breadth in literature to fully explain their role in ROS formation. However, literature has shown success in their analysis and application.

=== Sonoluminescence ===
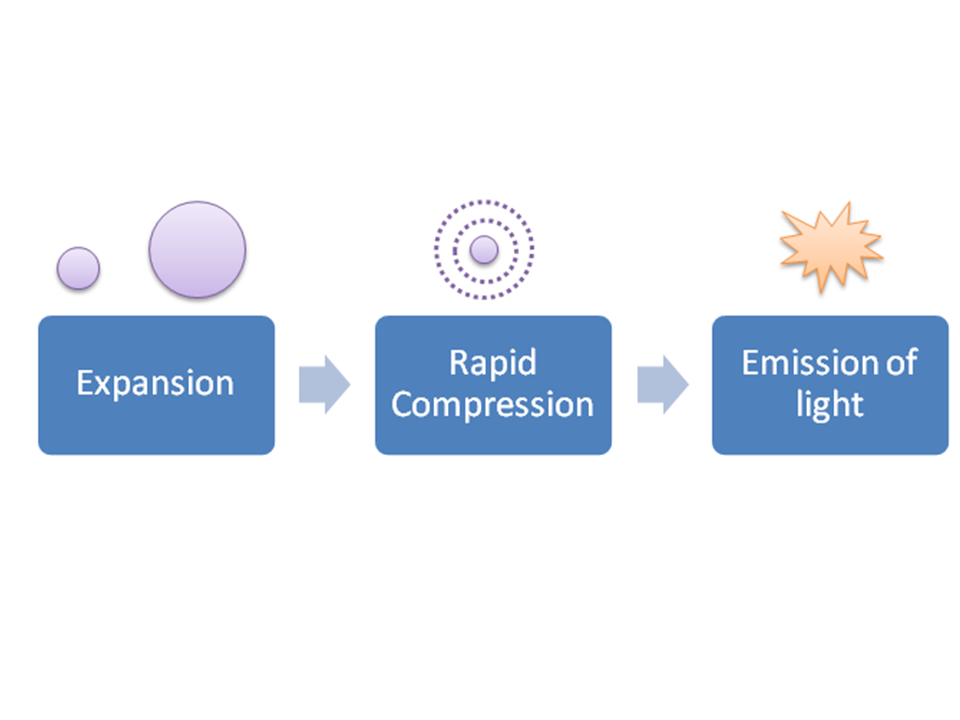
Sonoluminescence acoustics

Two primary mechanisms of ROS generation exist in sonodynamic therapy: sonoluminescence and pyrolysis. Sonoluminescence occurs when ultrasound produces light after irradiating an aqueous solution The exact mechanism with which light is produced remains unclear. However, it is suggested that inertial cavitation is a key element for this process. Other studies also indicate the potential role of stable cavitation

=== Pyrolysis ===
Pyrolysis is believed to occur when inertial cavitation induces an extreme temperature increase, degrades the sonosensitizers, thus producing free radicals that can react and ultimately produce ROS necessary for SDT. The localized temperature increase assists in the inertial cavitation and breakdown of the sonosensitizer in order to create ROS. The pyrolysis within the cavitation bubbles will produce H+ and OH- via weak bonding within the solute molecule.

=== Lipid Peroxidation ===
Mechanism of lipid peroxidation.

In addition to chemical methods, mechanical properties of the acoustic wave generated from the ultrasound can assist in initiating cytotoxic effects. This occurs through disruption of the membrane with a hydrophobic sonosensitizer. The mechanical disruption of the membrane causes a process called lipid peroxidation and adjustments to the cell membrane can change cell drug permeability. Both sonochemical and sonomechanical methodologies are used to generate ROS and release cargo from vesicles for applications such as tumor targeting.

=== Apoptosis ===
Low intensity ultrasound has been shown within past literature to induce apoptotic effects within surrounding cells. It has been found that it is not the initial ROS that causes apoptosis within the cells, but the free radicals within the mitochondria. In a study by Honda et al., it was determined that the mitochondria-caspase pathway is responsible for apoptosis through the increase of intracellular calcium. Outside of ROS induced apoptosis, cavitation is another factor involved within apoptosis of surrounding cells. Both cavitation types are able to induce apoptosis through damage to the membrane. Conditions such as frequency, duty cycle, pulse, and intensity can be manipulated to optimize cell death conditions such as necrosis, lysis, or apoptosis.

=== Autophagy ===
This method of cell death can occur by cell organelles becoming entrapped into autophagosomes that combine with lysosomes. Continuation of this process will lead to cell death and autophagy inhibitors or promoters can be controlled to encourage or discourage cell death and uptake of chemotherapeutics.

== Sonosensitizers ==
Sonosensitizers, or sonosensitizing therapeutics, are the primary element of SDT and can be tailored to treat various cancers and generate different effects. These therapeutics, often involving the use of porphyrin or xanthene, will initiate a toxic effect via the ROS upon exposure to ultrasound.

=== Porphyrin-based sensitizers ===
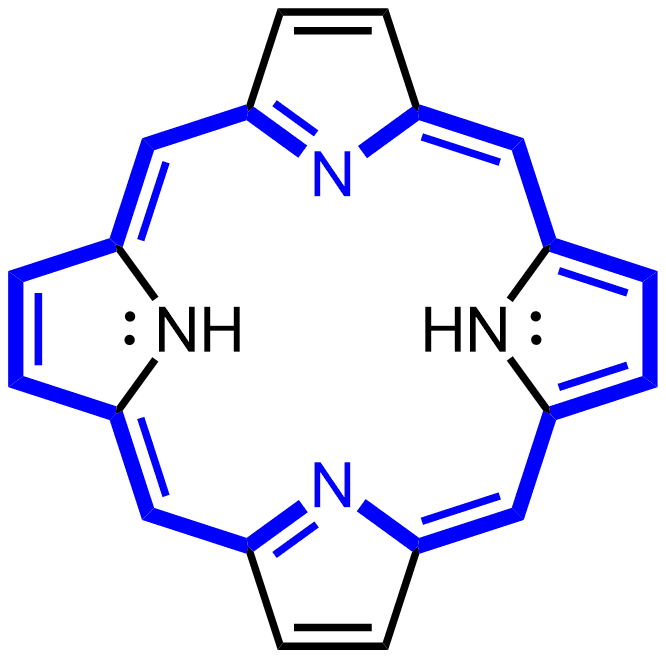
The 18-electron cycle of porphin, the parent structure of porphyrin, highlighted. (Several other choices of atoms, through the pyrrole nitrogens, for example, also give 18-electron cycles.)

Porphyrin-based sensitizers, initially used as a photosensitizer in PDT, are fairly hydrophobic molecules derived from hematoporphyrin. Single oxygen atoms or hydroxyl radicals are produced by porphyrin-based sensitizers upon exposure to ultrasound or light, providing the cytotoxic effects desired with sonodynamic and photodynamic therapies. However, the result of porphyrin-based sensitizers is not as local as desired for sonodynamic therapy since they are also located in non-targeted tissue between the tumor and the ultrasound emitter.

=== Xanthene-based sensitizers ===
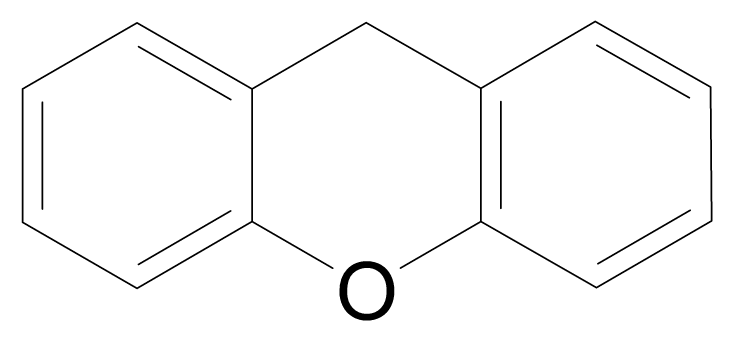
Xanthene

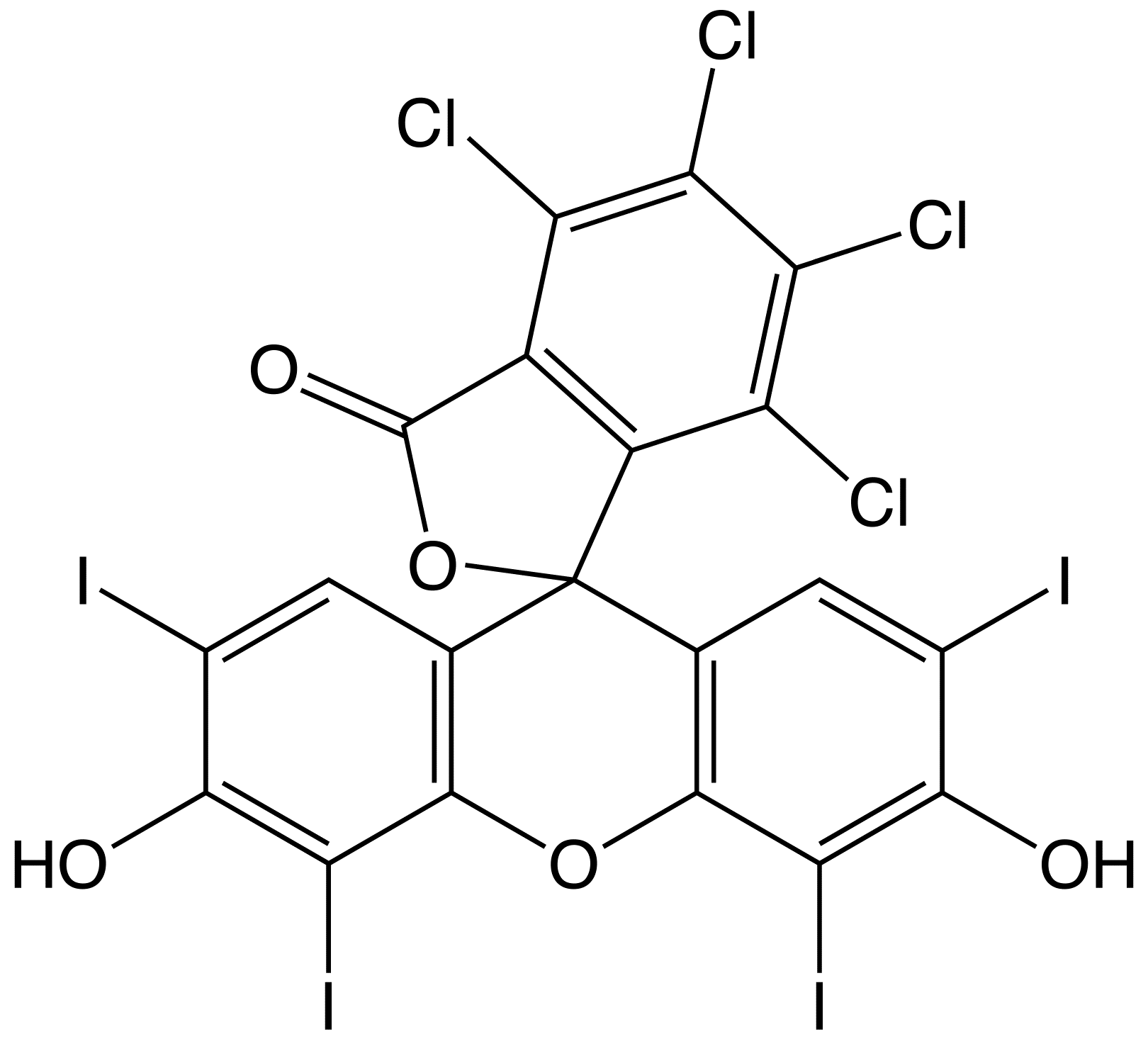
Rose Bengal

Xanthene-based sensitizers, on the other hand, have shown successful cytotoxicity in vitro by producing reactive oxygen species after being triggered by ultrasound. More research is necessary to improve its potential in vivo performance since it is quickly processed by the liver and cleared from the body. Rose Bengal is a commonly used xanthene-based sonosensitizer.

=== Additional sensitizers ===
Other sensitizers that have been investigated for their potential in sonodynamic therapy (and have also been used previously in PDT) include acridine orange, methylene blue, curcumin, and indocyanine green. A study by Suzuki et al. used acridine orange, a fluorescent cationic dye that can insert itself into nucleic acids, for treating sarcoma 180 cells with ultrasound and demonstrated that reactive oxygen species are a critical element of SDT considering that their absence decreased the efficacy of SDT. Similar to the previous study, a recent study by Komori et al. utilized ultrasound coupled with methylene blue (a phenothiazine dye commonly used in PDT that exhibits low toxicity) to irradiate sarcoma 180 cells and found that methylene blue was an effective sonosensitizer in decreasing cell viability. Interestingly, curcumin is a spice that also can act as a sensitizer for PDT and SDT. In a study by Waksman et al., curcumin was able to impact macrophages, which are important for development of plaques found in atherosclerosis patients, thus reducing the amount of plaque in an animal model. These findings along with other research indicate that curcumin sensitizers could be used in SDT cancer treatments. Indocyanine green is a dye that absorbs near infrared wavelengths and is another sensitizer that has been shown to reduce cell viability when coupled with ultrasound and/or light. An in vivo study demonstrated that treating a mouse tumor model with indocyanine green coupled with ultrasound and light resulted in a 98% reduction in tumor volume by 27 days after treatment.

Name and structure of additional sensitizers
Name	Structure
Phthalocyanine	Phthalocyanine
Indocyanine Green	Indocyanine Green
Phenothiazine	Phenothiazine
Curcumin-keto	Curcumin_structure_(Keto)
Curcumin-enol	Curcumin-enol

== Carriers ==
As aforementioned, sonosensitizers are often used in conjunction with different drug carriers such as microbubbles, nanobubbles, liposomes, and exosomes to improve therapeutic agent concentration and penetration.

=== Liposomes ===
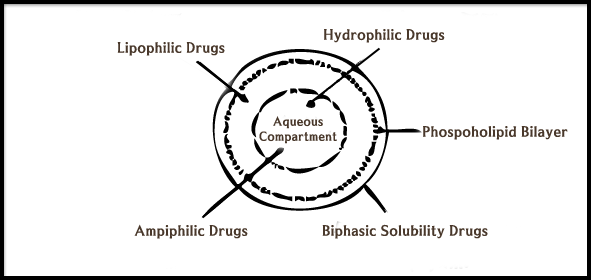
Liposome Drug Incorporation

Liposomes are a common vehicle in drug delivery and specifically for the treatment of cancer. Liposomes contain a phospholipid bilayer. It is prevalent due to its ability to penetrate leaky vasculature and poor lymphatic drainage within tumors for enhanced permeability retention. These drug carriers can encapsulate hydrophobic and lipophilic molecules within their lipid bilayer and can be made naturally or synthetically. In addition, liposomes can entrap hydrophilic molecules in their hydrophilic core. Compared to the common cancer treatment chemotherapy, drugs loaded into liposomes allow for decreased systemic toxicity and a potential increase in the efficacy of targeted delivery. Success with liposomes as drug delivery systems has been shown both in vivo and in vitro. A study by Liu et al. showed that liposomes can be used alongside SDT to trigger the release of drugs via oxidation of the lipid components. Another study by Ninomiya et al. utilized nanoemulsion droplets exposed to ultrasonic waves for the formation of larger gas bubbles to disrupt the liposome membrane for drug release. Many properties and elements of liposomes can be altered for their specific purpose and to increase effectiveness, particularly their ability to travel in the blood and interact with cells and tissues in the body. These elements include their diameter, charge, arrangement, as well as the makeup of their membranes. Dai et al. proposed the incorporation of sonosensitizers with liposomes to enhance target specificity. Since SDT stimulates cancerous tissues to absorb and retain sonosentizers followed by activation with extracorporeal ultrasound, Dai et al. investigated the effect of liposome-encapsulated drugs on the efficacy of targeted delivery in SDT. They found that, in addition to its convenience and practicality, SDT is a safe and effective option for treating cancer.

=== Exosomes ===
Exosomes are nanocarriers that can provide targeted drug delivery of therapeutics to enhance local cytotoxic effects while minimizing any systemic impact. They are acquired from cells and are used for transportation purposes within the cell as membrane-bound vesicles. Advantages of exosomes for drug delivery purposes include their ability to be manipulated and engineered, in addition to their low toxicity and immunogenicity. They have also inspired research into non-cell-based treatment methods for various cancers and diseases. Other desirable aspects of exosomes include their overall biocompatibility and stability. A study by Nguyen Cao et al. investigated the use of exosomes for the delivery of indocyanine green (ICG), a sonosensitizer for breast cancer treatment. Significantly increased reactive oxygen species generation was observed in breast cancer cells treated with folic acid-conjugated exosomes. This is one example of a sonosensitizer used to treat a specific cancer using sonodynamic therapy. Another example of exosome-based sonodynamic therapy was illustrated by Liu et al. In this study, exosomes were decorated with porphyrin sensitizers and this system was used with an external ultrasound device to control and target drug delivery through SDT. Liu et al. provided a non-invasive method for treating cancer through extracorporeal activation of exosomes through ultrasound.

=== Microbubbles ===
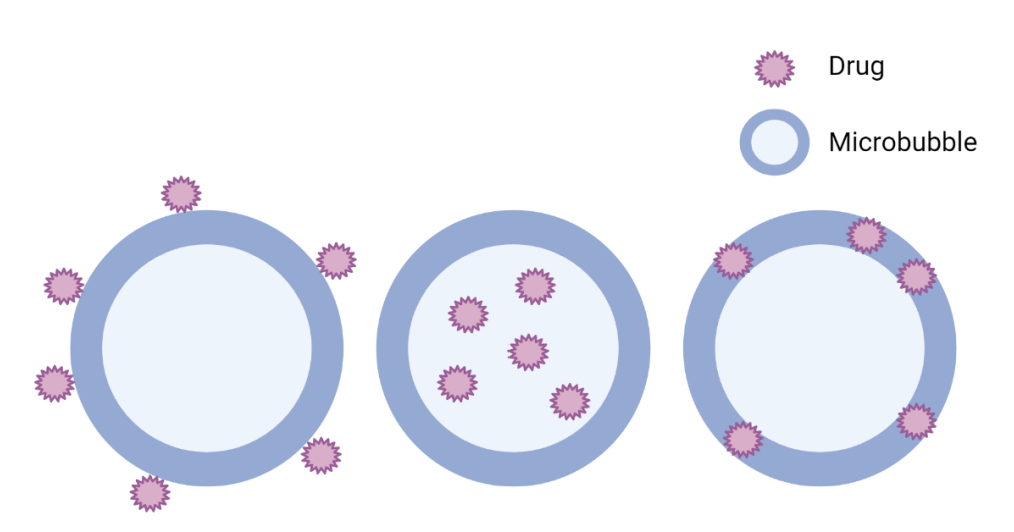
Mechanisms for Loading Microbubbles with Drug

Due to their ability to oscillate with exposure to low-frequency ultrasound, microbubbles have been used as contrast agents in order to visualize tissues in which the microbubbles have permeated. However, when these microspheres are exposed to higher pressure ultrasound, they can rupture, which could be beneficial for drug delivery purposes. Through SDT, these microbubbles could be selectively bursted at the tumor microenvironment in order to decrease systemic levels of the encapsulated drug and increase therapeutic efficacy. When applying SDT, the increase in acoustic pressure leads to the inertial cavitation, or collapse of the microbubble and local release of the cargo within. The inertial cavitation of the microbubbles when exposed to SDT is also referred to as ultrasound mediated microbubble destruction (UMMD). The shell of microbubbles can be decorated with different components, including polymers, lipids, or proteins depending on their intended purpose. Microbubbles have also been used for the localized release of attached cargo. This cargo is typically chemotherapeutics, antibiotics, or genes. Different drugs can be directly loaded into the microbubble with methods such as conjugation and nanoparticle, liposome loading, and genes. The combination of genes and SDT is referred to as sonotransfection. Examples of outer shell modifications can be seen in a study by McEwan et al. which found that lipid microbubbles showed reduced stability when sonosensitizers were added to their shells. However, attaching the polymer poly lactic-co-glycolic acid (PLGA) to the shell resulted in increased stability compared to the lipid microbubbles without losing other desirable properties such as targeted delivery and selective cytotoxicity. In another study, McEwan et al. investigated the ability of microbubbles carrying oxygen to increase production of reactive oxygen species, which are a necessary component of SDT, in the hypoxic environment of many solid tumors. These microbubbles were stabilized with lipids and a Rose Bengal sonosensitizer was attached to the surface to treat pancreatic cancer. Their work showed that coupling oxygen-loaded microbubbles that are sensitive to ultrasound with sonosensitizing drugs could allow for increased drug activation at the desired target even if hypoxia is present. Examples of therapeutics that have been loaded into microbubbles are gemcitabine, paclitaxel nanoparticles, plasmid DNA and 2,2′-azobis[2-(2-imidazolin-2-yl)propane]dihydrochloride loaded liposomes. Due to the targeting nature of the ligands connected to the microbubble, it allows for the controlled and specific targeting of the desired tissue for treatment. Another study performed by Nesbitt et al. has shown improved tumor reduction when gemcitabine was loaded into the microbubble and applied to a human pancreatic cancer xenograft model with SDT.

=== Nanobubbles ===
Similar to microbubbles, nanobubbles have shown efficacy in SDT. However, due to their smaller size, nanobubbles are able to reach targets that microbubbles cannot. Nanobubbles can reach deeper tissue and travel past the vasculature. Previous research has demonstrated that nanobubbles are more capable of reaching the tumor since they can permeate endothelial cells and migrate away from the vasculature. One study by Nittayacharn et al. developed doxorubicin-loaded nanobubbles and paired them with porphyrin sensitizers to be used in SDT for treatment of breast and ovarian cancer cells in vitro. They found an almost 70% increase in cytotoxicity when using SDT compared to only perfluoropropane nanobubbles filled with iridium(III). Additionally, compared to empty nanobubbles and/or free iridium(III), they observed greatest reactive oxygen species generation in the iridium(III)-nanobubbles exposed to ultrasound. These results demonstrate that nanobubbles loaded with a sonosensitizer and exposed to ultrasound could be a potential effective treatment for cancer using SDT. As with microbubbles, nanobubbles have also shown promise as oxygen-delivering vesicles to enhance the effectiveness of SDT. In order to mitigate hypoxia of target tissue, Owen et al. used a pancreatic cancer rodent model to deliver phospholipid stabilized nanobubbles filled with oxygen. The mice were divided into groups, one that received oxygen-filled nanobubbles prior to injection of a sonosensitizer and one that didn't. A statistically significant difference between the levels of oxygen in the tumors of the two groups was observed, indicating that nanobubbles could be an effective addition to SDT to treat cancers in a hypoxic environment.

== Applications ==
=== Combination with other therapies ===
Sonodynamic therapy can be combined with other therapeutic techniques to enhance treatment efficacy for various types of cancers and diseases. SDT can be combined with photodynamic therapy, chemotherapy, radiation, MRI, and immunotherapy. PDT has often been used in combination with SDT as sonosensitizers are also photosensitive. During initial development of SDT, Umemura et al., have determined that hematoporphyrins were able to initiate cell death similarly to PDT. This is due to SDT being able to initiate sonoluminescence. However, the advantage of SDT over PDT is that it can penetrate deep and precisely into the targeted tissue. In a study by Lui et al., it was shown that using a combination of these two delivery methods results in increased cytotoxicity with sino porphyrin in a metastatic xenograft model. In another example of combining SDT with PDT, Borah et al. investigated the advantage of 2-(1-hexyloxyethyl)-2-devinyl pyropheophorbide-a (HHPH), a photodynamic therapy drug, as a sonosensitizer and a photosensitizer for treating glioblastoma. Combining these therapies showed increased cell kill/tumor response, possibly caused by synergistic effects.

The goal of a study by Browning et al. was to investigate the potential enhancement of chemoradiation efficacy through combining it with sonodynamic therapy in pancreatic cancer patients. In one model, survival increased with the combination compared to chemoradiation alone. Differences in the results for the two different models could be attributed to variations in tumor organization. The tumors that showed the greatest reduction in size were less vascularized, perhaps making them more vulnerable to SDT. Another study, by Huang et al. used elements of mesoporous organosilica-based nanosystems to fabricate a sonosensitizer to be used with MRI-guided SDT. Increased cell death and inhibiting tumor growth was induced by the sonosensitizers, indicating high SDT efficiency. This shows how SDT can assist with both removal and inhibition of tumor growth.

SDT has also been combined with immunotherapy. A study by Lin et al. aimed to use cascade immuno-sonodynamic therapy to enhance tumor treatment using antibodies. The nanosonosensitizers resulted in high drug loading efficiency and a tumor-specific adaptive immune response. This serves as an example as to how SDT can be coupled with checkpoint blockade immunotherapy to enhance efficiency in cancer treatments. Another study by Yue et al. strived to combine checkpoint-blockade immunotherapy with nanosonosensitizers-augmented noninvasive sonodynamic therapy. Along with inhibiting lung metastasis, this combination promoted an anti-tumor response that prohibited tumor growth. This provides a proof-of-concept for combining SDT with another therapy to enhance treatment effects for the short and long term.

=== Types of cancers SDT has been shown to treat ===
==== Cancer Treatment ====
The treatment of many different types of cancers has been investigated using sonodynamic therapy both in vitro and/or in vivo including, glioblastoma, pancreatic, breast, ovarian, lung, prostate, liver, stomach, and colon cancers. A study by Gao et al. showed that SDT is capable of inhibiting angiogenesis through the production of ROS. This hindered the proliferation, migration, and invasion of endothelial cells, tumor growth, intratumoral vascularity, and vascular endothelial growth factor expression within the tumor cell in xenograft rat models. Hachimine et al. performed a large in vitro study testing SDT on seventeen different cancer cell lines. The types of cancers included were pancreatic, breast, lung, prostate, liver, stomach, and colon cancers. The most successful treatment was that of lung cancer with 23.4% cell viability post-therapy. Qu et al. aimed to develop an "all-in-one" nanosensitizer platform triggered by SDT that combines various diagnostic and therapeutic effects to treat glioblastoma. Apoptosis was successfully induced and mitophagy was inhibited in glioma cells. This is an example of how SDT can be used with a different platform to treat glioblastoma. Borah et al., as mentioned above, also investigated the ability of SDT (and PDT) to treat glioblastoma and found that SDT (combined with PDT) was able to increase the number of tumor cells killed. McEwan et al. and Owen et al. both demonstrated the use of micro/nanobubbles to enhance the oxygen concentration near hypoxic pancreatic tumors, thereby increasing the efficacy of SDT.

==== Breast Cancer ====
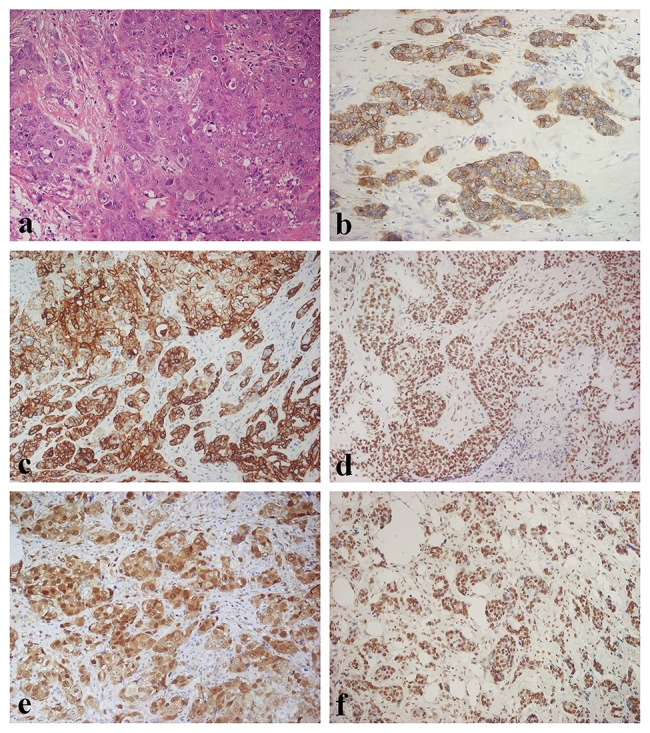
Morphologic and immunohistochemical features of Triple Negative Breast Cancer

12% of women in the US will be diagnosed with breast cancer. Metastasis and recurrence is a large challenge for deep-seated solid state tumors. SDT is currently being explored as a treatment method for breast cancer, while avoiding the side effects associated with current therapeutic methods. There has been shown success in utilizing SDT in animal and human clinical trials in reduction of tumor size through mitochondrial targeting to initiate apoptosis of tumor cells and autophagy and immune response regulation. However, there are still complications with proper therapeutic efficacy when used alone.

==== Glioma ====
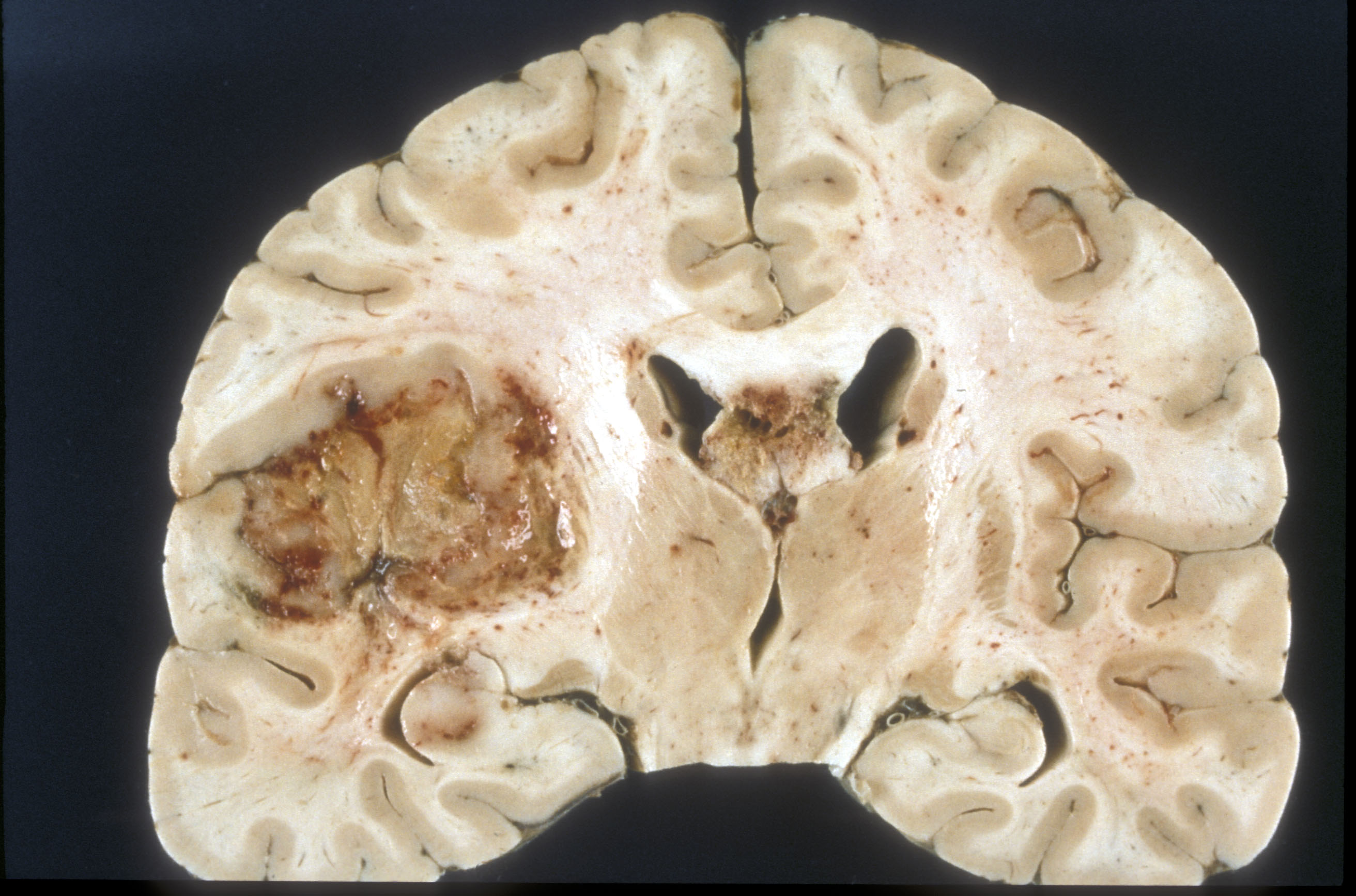
Glioblastoma

Malignant glioma is an extremely difficult to treat brain tumor that is a leading cause of death worldwide and half of cancer-related deaths. Complications associated with treating glioma include the blood brain barrier (BBB). This protective mechanism for the brain also raises challenges for drug delivery through the tight junctions between endothelial cells, only allowing small lipid-soluble drugs (<400 Da) to permeate. Current delivery methods are surgery and chemotherapy. SDT has been implemented as a method to open the BBB and has shown success in opening tight junctions for delivery. Examples of sonosensitizers that have shown success in glioma treatment are hematopor-phyrin monomethyl ether (HMME), porfimer sodium (Photofrin), di-sulfo-di-phthalimidomethyl phthalolcyaninezinc (ZnPcS2P2), Photolon, 5-aminolevulinic acid (5-ALA), and rose bengal (RB). These have shown to induce effects such as opening of the BBB, improved vascular permeability, and apoptosis of glioma cells.

==== Prostate Cancer ====
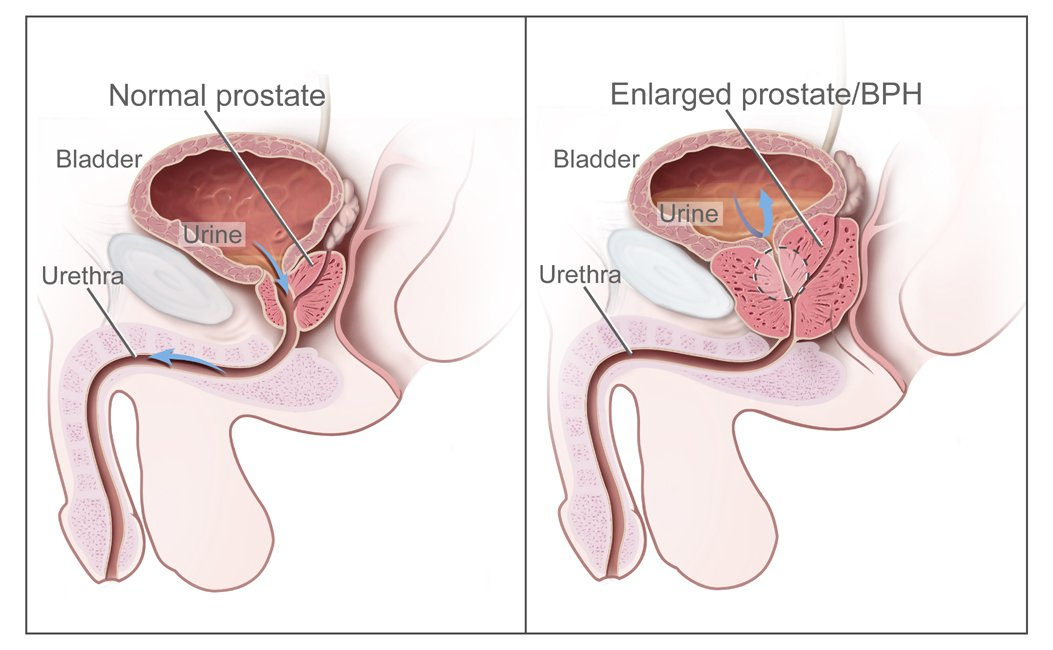
Benign prostatic hyperplasia

Prostate cancer is the second cause of cancer and the most common malignancy associated with deaths in men worldwide. Current methods of treatments are invasive resection therapy, radiation therapy, and prostatectomy that can cause complications such as incontinence, impotence, and damage to surrounding organs and tissues. Current studies have shown success in using SDT as a stand-alone treatment. SDT uses mitochondria related apoptosis for the reduction of cell viability. SDT for prostate cancer treatment has also been used alongside chemotherapeutics such as docetaxel microbubbles. This has shown to enhance the effects of docetaxel through a reduction in tumor perfusion and enhanced necrosis and apoptosis. The SDT and docetaxel group showed reduction in tumor growth. Overall, the use of SDT has shown promising results in prostate cancer treatment.

==== Arterial Diseases ====
Sonodynamic therapy could be used to treat more than just cancers. Atherosclerosis, which is a chronic arterial disease, is another target that has been observed in the literature. This disease occurs when fatty plaques aggregate on the inner surface of the artery and could be caused by malfunctions in lipid metabolism. More specifically, atherosclerosis is caused by an increase in endothelial permeability causing low-density lipoprotein particles to become oxidized and undergo sedimentation. These lipoproteins cause an increase in macrophages and lead to intensified plaque build up. As a result, the high influx of macrophages is the target for AS treatment in order to slow plaque build-up. Alongside the relationship between plaque build-up and macrophages, monocyte's differentiation into macrophages exacerbates the aforementioned process in addition to causing inflammation.

Normal Artery versus Atherosclerosis

A study by Wang et al. aimed to understand the underlying mechanisms regarding the potential effect of non-lethal SDT on atheroscleroic plaques. It was determined that non-lethal SDT prevents plaque development. A study performed by Jiang et al., showed success in SDT through the reduction of macrophage inflammatory factors such as TNF-alpha, IL-12, and IL-1B. They also showed that SDT could inhibit plaque inflammation in patients with peripheral artery disease and continue to promote positive results for longer than six months. Popular sonosensitizers for AS treatment are protoporphyrin IX (PpIX) and 5-aminolevulinic acid (5-ALA). PpIX is often used in PDT and is generated through 5-ALA, a non ultrasound-activated component, through increasing PpIX concentration within a cell. A study by Cheng et al. determined that THP-1 macrophage apoptosis is induced by an increase in PpiX concentration, leading to the production of large amounts of ROS. The use of SDT for AS treatment has also shown success in promoting the repopulation of vascular smooth muscle cells (VMSCs) through inducing further expression and autophagy to prevent VMSC evolution into plaque-holding macrophages. A study performed by Dan et al. showed the increase in smooth muscle a-actin, smooth muscle 22a, p38 mitogen-activated protein kinase phosphorylation. While a study by Geng et al. showed improved VMSC autophagy. Each of these factors contributed to the improved differentiation and development of VMSCs.

=== In Vitro and In Vivo Work ===
==== In vitro ====
In vitro experimentation provides great insight and knowledge to characterize the potential of sonosensitizer behavior in vivo. In addition, SDT has shown success through its low intensity allowing increased plasma membrane permeability without cell death. Sonosensitizers have also been used in vitro in applications with different cell lines and to further understand the mechanism of action for cell death. It is currently understood that PDT and SDT have similar mechanisms for free radical generation for inducing apoptosis and necrosis. However, each cell line is unique and can cause cell death with different efficacy. Some examples of in vitro work include initial studies that were performed by Yumita et al., 1989 who used haematoprophyrin and SDT for mouse sarcoma 180 and rat ascites hepatoma (AH) that showed a relationship between dosage and ultrasound, and microbubbles causing cavitation leading to cell damage without the use of drugs. This study also emphasized the difference in efficacy between cell lines through SDT 180 having less lysis compared to AH-130 cells. Another study by Hachimine et al. emphasized efficacy between cell lines by examining seven different cancers with 17 cell lines total under the use of DCPH-P-NA(I). This study revealed that the stomach and lung cancer lines of MKN-28 and LU65A respectively had the highest survival rate, but the stomach and lung cancer lines of RERFLC-KJ and MKN-45 respectively had the lowest survival rates. Another study by Honda et al., with U937 and K562 showed that sonication increases the intracellular calcium ion levels and decreases GSH concentration respectively. This increased concentration of calcium plays a significant role in cell death through DNA fragmentation and mitochondrial membrane disruption. While a decreased concentration of GSH plays a significant role in allowing the formation of more free radicals. A study by Umemura et al., found that ATX-70 versus hematoporphyrin has increased cytotoxic activity. Current research typically focuses on using tumor xenograft models to determine the effect of SDT on target cells and delivery efficacy.

==== In vivo ====
Building upon the study by Umemura et al. and ATX-70, it was found that 24h after administration of the sonosensitizer had improved efficacy when ultrasound was applied compared to immediate administration. It was also determined that most ultrasound frequencies range between 1-3 MHz and 0.5-4W/cm^2. Higher frequencies at values such as 20W/cm^2 and 25W/cm^2 resulted in large necrotic lesions. This established a relationship between sonosensitizer formulation and ultrasound intensity to necrosis. Other studies have continued to innovate upon this by controlling drug ultrasound interval (DUI) for different sonosensitizers in order to determine the optimal time period to apply the ultrasound for improved efficacy. In addition, it has been shown that SDT can disturb surrounding vasculature in tumors. This has been shown in studies by Gao et al. with 5-ALA in mice and human umbilical vein endothelial cell lines through inhibition of microvessel density and cell proliferation, migration, and invasion.

== Challenges and development ==
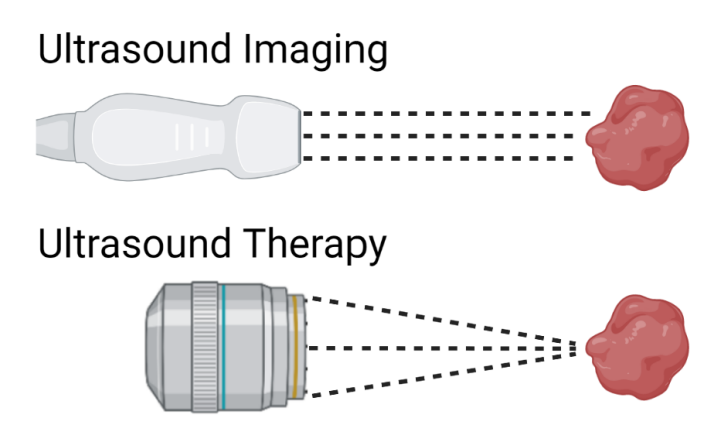
Ultrasound Imaging vs. Ultrasound Therapy

One of the many advantages of SDT compared to PDT is the ability of SDT to penetrate deeply placed solid tumors allowing a wider treatment range. Despite this fact, there are limitations to SDT that must be overcome or have optimized components in order to expand the effect and application of SDT. SDT does allow for precise activation of the therapeutic, but is limited in the delivery and accumulation of the delivery modality to penetrate deeply into the desired tumor site. This is often accommodated for through delivery vessels such as nanoparticles or liposomes. However, nanomedicine is limited by the enhanced permeability and retention effect and struggles to deliver in targeted abundance depending on the delivery vesicle. This can be seen in nanoparticles struggling with non-specific delivery. Future research has been focused on developing high targeting and penetrating nanoparticles for improved delivery and pharmacokinetics. Due to the complex nature of tumors and their microenvironments, they are difficult to treat with only one therapy. In order to enhance the oftentimes low production of reactive oxygen species to address the hypoxic tumor environment, SDT can be combined with other therapies, such as PDT, chemotherapy, and immunotherapy to improve patient outcomes. SDT alone does not respond well in hypoxic environments. However, bioreductive therapy could be used to reduce the impact of SDT's limitations regarding hypoxia in the tumor while leaving healthy/normal tissue alone. Sonosensitizers also require continuous high levels of oxygen to create ROS, which is not readily available within a hypoxic tumor microenvironment. However, strategies such as oxygen supplementation and production to supply the required oxygen and enhance cavitation, and glutathione depletion to avoid the reduction of the free radicals produced have been implemented alongside sonosensitizers to supply the required oxygen or reduce the combative function. In addition to its relatively low generation of reactive oxygen species, SDT also can cause permanent destruction of normal tissues. This lack of selectivity is caused by ultrasound divergence, resulting in heat and shear that impacts off-target tissues. Although advantages of organic sonosensitizers exist, such as high reproducibility, biocompatibility, production of reactive oxygen species, they also have limitations. Factors that limit the translation of organic sensitizers to clinical applications include low water solubility, sonotoxicity, and targetability as well as high phototoxiticty. Other properties could promote rapid clearance of the drug, which is why various nano and microparticles are used to transport the drug to the desired location. In addition, sonosensitizers in SDT often require increased dosage, and the relationship between therapeutic dosage and toxicity of sonosensitizers has not been properly characterized alongside other variables such as tissue type and acoustic pressure. Inorganic sensitizers produce reactive oxygen species, but in lower concentrations than desirable for SDT, limiting their ability to be used in a clinical setting. Another challenge is reflected in vitro and in vivo work. An example of this can be seen in a study using rose bengal, a xanthene dye. It was found to be successful in vitro, but in vivo showed significantly less efficacy due to liver squestation and clearance. Lastly, there are no current standardized computer simulations to predict the characteristics of different sonosenistizers within tissue, which would provide further insight into how sonosensitizers may behave.

== Current clinical use ==
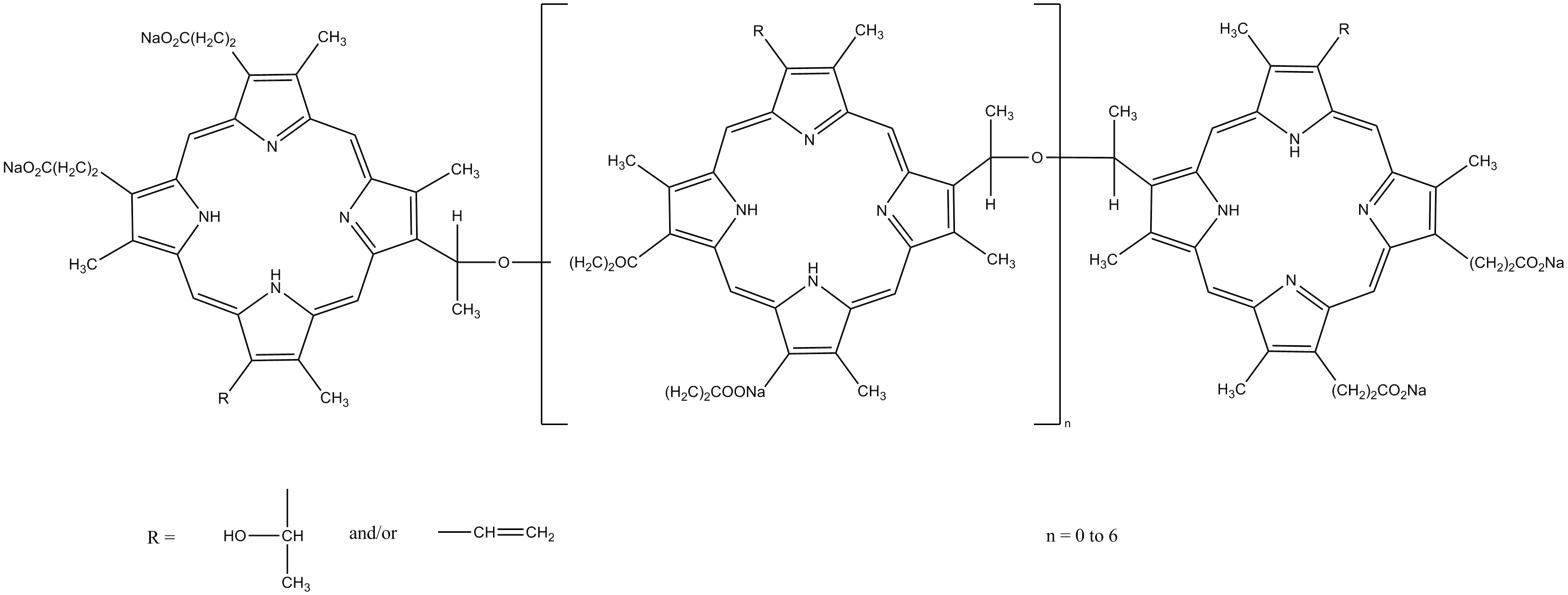
Photofrin

SDT has been researched most commonly to combat cancers and atherosclerosis such as breast cancer, pancreatic cancer, liver, and spinal sarcomas. Currently, there are no FDA approved clinical applications of SDT. However, for PDT, Photofrin is an FDA approved hematoporphyrin (PHOTOFRIN®). However, SDT has been used in a clinical trial in combination with PDT to assess for reduction in tumor size in patients with breast cancer. However, it was difficult to determine if SDT PDT or the drug dosage was the primary mechanism of treatment. Another case study expanded on this by using SDT as a standalone treatment with a Gc protein hormone therapy with the use of 5-ALA or chlorin e6 as a sonosensitizer. It was shown that tumor markers significantly decreased during treatment.

== Future directions ==
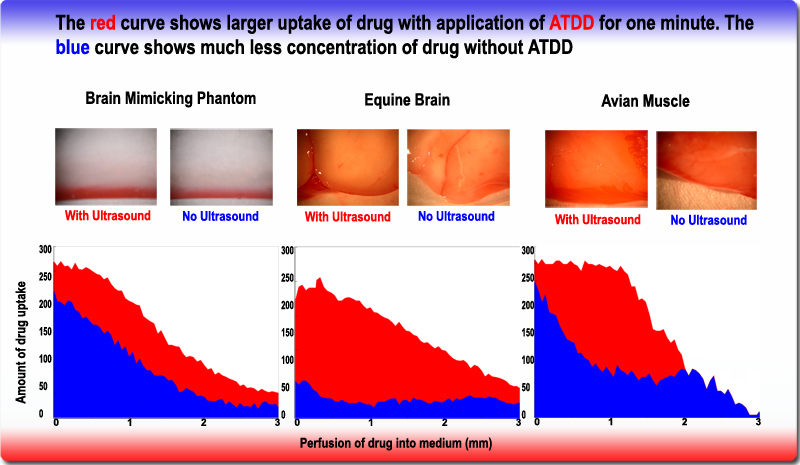
Enhanced drug uptake using acoustic targeted drug delivery (ATDD).

The effectiveness of sonodynamic therapy as a cancer treatment is supported by many in vitro and in vivo studies. However, large-scale clinical trials are necessary for translation into the clinical setting. In order to mitigate the limitations aforementioned, new sonosensitizers are being developed and SDT is being combined with other therapies in novel ways. Particularly, organic sonosensitizers with high solubility in water, high sonotoxocity, increased ability to target tumors, and low phototoxicity need to be developed in order to improve the therapeutic efficacy of SDT and allow it to be used for treating cancers. In addition, the mechanisms by which ROS are produced by sonosensitizers upon exposure to ultrasound is yet to be determined, reducing the ability to control its function and outcomes. Ultimately, the synergistic effects of combining SDT with other therapies would allow each to compensate for the limitations of the other, improving their therapeutic efficacy and increasing their ability to destroy tumors.
