= Sonophoresis =

Drug delivery through the skin

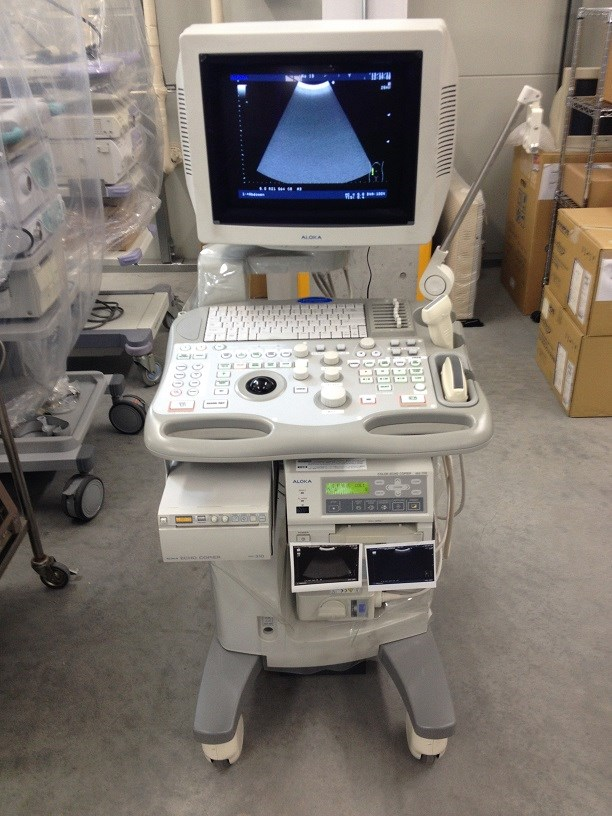
An Aloka SSD 3500 ultrasound machine

Sonophoresis also known as phonophoresis, is a method that utilizes ultrasound to enhance the delivery of topical medications through the stratum corneum, to the epidermis and dermis. Sonophoresis allows for the enhancement of the permeability of the skin along with other modalities, such as iontophoresis, to deliver drugs with lesser side effects. Currently, sonophoresis is used widely in transdermal drug delivery, but has potential applications in other sectors of drug delivery, such as the delivery of drugs to the eye and brain.

== Historical advancements ==
Sonophoresis, also known as phonophoresis, was dated back all the way to the 1950s in its first mention in a published report. This report showcased that a hydrocodone injection yielded better outcomes for bursitis when combined with an ultrasound massage. Following this, a series of publications from several investigators showed the increased therapeutic effect when combining ultrasound with hydrocortisone injections for various other disease states, further demonstrating the novelty of sonophoresis. However, while some researchers provided evidence that ultrasound had a positive effect on the transdermal permeation of drugs, others contradicted this information by displaying research that showed no quantitative effect using ultrasound. These early studies mainly investigated the combination of therapeutics with high-frequency sonophoresis (HFS), which can be categorized into frequencies greater than 0.7 MHz. High frequency sonophoresis usually includes a range between 0.7 – 16 MHz. Studies evolved and HFS was continually studied for four decades until a greater understanding of a mechanism of action, cavitation, was discovered. Cavitational effects are inversely proportional to the frequency of the ultrasound applied, which led to further studies of low-frequency sonophoresis (LFS) for use in transdermal drug delivery due to studies showing greater efficacy in enhancing skin permeability in comparison to HFS. Low-frequency sonophoresis usually includes a range between 20 and 100 kHz. For this reason, currently HFS focuses on topical applications for penetration through the stratum corneum, whereas LFS focuses on transdermal drug delivery applications.

== Background ==
Ultrasonic sonicators generate ultrasound waves, which is a longitudinal compression wave, by converting electrical energy into mechanical energy by deformation of piezoelectric crystals in response to an electric field. The frequency of the waves generated by this method can range from 20 kHz up to 3 MHz. The ultrasound waves generated from this device allow for penetration through biological tissue by molecular oscillation of the biological tissue they travel through. The amplitude of the wave can be modified by manipulating the displacement of the ultrasound horn for each half cycle as they are proportional.

The primary purpose of phonophoresis is to assist in transdermal drug delivery, usually with the help of a coupling agent or medium. Transdermal drug delivery sometimes does not permeate the skin to reach a targeted area within the body because of the stratum corneum layer of the skin, a layer that prevents foreign substances from penetrating the body. Transdermal drug delivery is patient-compliance, usually avoids digestive system degradation, and has the ability to use drugs with short half-lives.

== Mechanisms of action ==
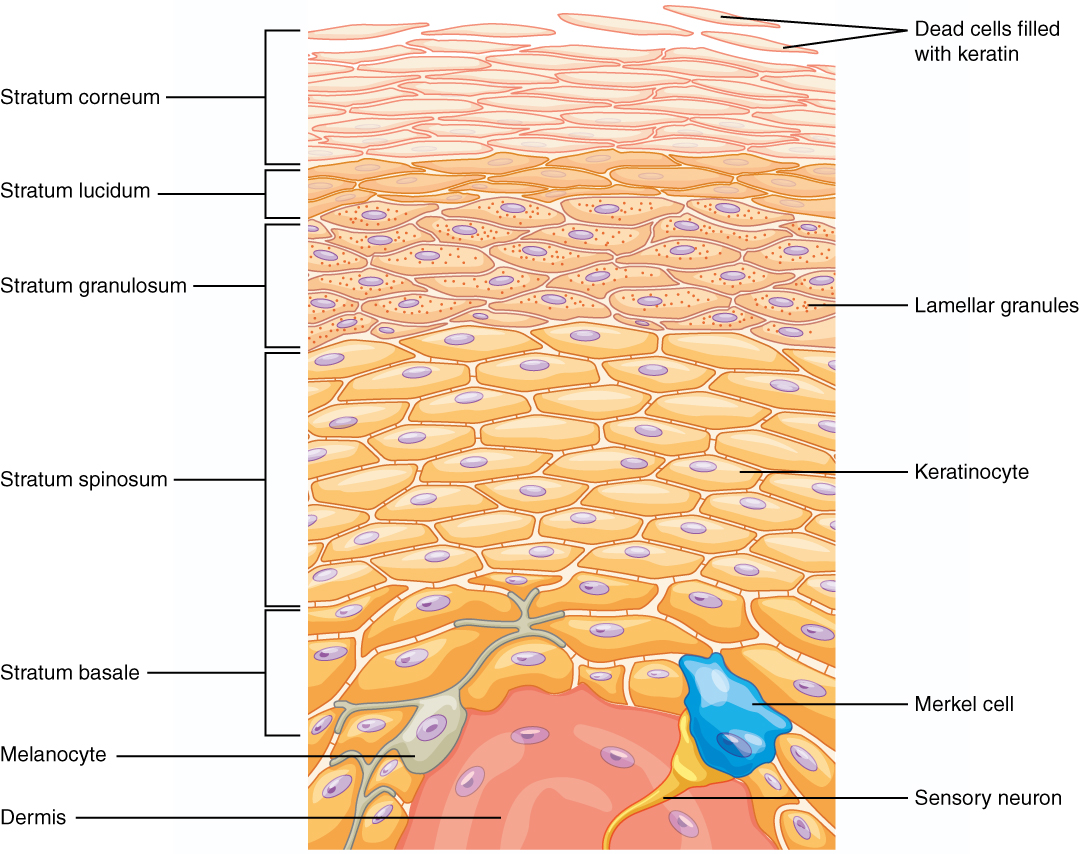
The layers of the epidermis – the stratum corneum layer can be seen at the top

While increased skin permeability is seen through sonophoresis, the precise mechanisms to describe sonophoresis are yet to be fully discovered. However, there are several important mechanisms that have been identified that contribute to the phenomenon of sonophoresis.

=== Cavitation ===
Cavitation is generally determined to be the dominant mechanism that drives sonophoresis. It can be described as the distortion, expansion, and contraction of gas bubbles in a liquid medium. The frequency of the ultrasound waves helps determine the bubble parameters, such as size and shape. There exist two types of cavitation, stable and transient. Stable cavitation is when cavitation bubbles persist over many acoustic pressure cycles without collapsing. On the other hand, transient cavitation is where these cavitation bubbles uncontrollably and rapidly grow and decay over many acoustic pressure cycles. However, while cavitation is considered the primary mechanism for sonophoresis, the gas bubbles that contribute to cavitation are generated by a process termed rectified diffusion.

=== Rectified diffusion ===
Rectified diffusion is the process where cavitation bubbles experience growth. The growth of these bubbles occurs by encountering a negative pressure half cycle, expanding the gas inside the bubble. Similarly, the gas bubble will dramatically decay in size when encountering the other positive half of the pressure cycle. There are further factors that manipulate the oscillation of the bubbles' size, such as temperature and composition of the gas and liquid phases. Depending on the dramatization of the oscillation from previously mentioned factors, stable or transient cavitation occurs. A rapid process will lead to transient cavitation bubbles, whereas a slower process will lead to stable cavitation bubbles.

=== Thermal effects ===
An important consideration when transferring energy to a patient would be the thermal energy generated from heating of the biological tissue due to energy losses from the ultrasound waves. It has been shown that increases in temperature can increase skin permeability through several factors. Two factors are increased kinetic energy and diffusivity of drugs, which allow for compounds to pass through the stratum corneum. Moreover, hair follicles and sweat glands are dilated, allowing for more points of entry for compounds. The enhanced circulation of blood that comes as a result of increased temperature from ultrasound parameters also allows for better diffusion of compounds. While the intensity and duty cycle of the ultrasound are directly proportional to the corresponding thermal effects, surprisingly thermal effects are not a considerable mechanism for HFS in ranges from 1 – 2 degrees Celsius. However, once larger temperature changes are observed, such as an excess of 10 degrees Celsius, permeant transport was increased. When it comes to LFS, thermal effects are an important consideration on the side of safety. Thermal effects need to be minimized at higher amplitudes, as burns and necrosis of tissues can occur due to exposure to high, sustained temperatures. A simple solution to counteract sustained exposure to high temperatures is to periodically replace the coupling agent every so often.

== Synergistic combination with other enhancement techniques ==
While sonophoresis alone is able to increase the permeability of skin by several factors depending on the procedure and the drug being delivered, a synergistic combination of sonophoresis with other enhancers, such as iontophoresis and electroporation, has shown greater enhancement as well as increased safety in reduction of individual enhancer parameters.

=== Iontophoresis ===
Iontophoresis is similar to sonophoresis as it is a method for transdermal drug delivery but does so by applying a voltage gradient across the skin. Since there are differences in pathways between iontophoresis and sonophoresis, a combination of these two methods allows for greater enhancement. For example, Le et al. displayed, for the case of heparin, that a combination of iontophoresis and sonophoresis resulted in a 56-fold enhancement of heparin flux in comparison to sonophoresis having a 3-fold enhancement and iontophoresis having a 15-fold enhancement.

=== Electroporation ===
Electroporation allows the cell membrane to open up after applying an electric field. By applying short, high voltage pulses to the stratum corneum, the lipid structure will become disorganized and allow enhancement of drug delivery. There are currently very few reports of the combination of these modalities being used together. However, in these reports, there is mention that the transdermal enhancement created by the combination was greater than the sum of the individual enhancers, suggesting that electroporation and sonophoresis work together synergistically.

== Treatment ==
=== Treatment methods ===
Phonophoresis can be performed using two main methods: The first is simultaneous treatment, where the drug can be applied at the same time as the ultrasound. The second method is pretreatment, where the ultrasound is used briefly before drug delivery. This is to ensure that the skin is permeable prior to the drug being applied.

When using an ultrasound, cavities will develop due to the pressure change. Stable cavitation describes the repetitive oscillations of a cavity bubble, while inertial cavitation describes the collapse of a cavity bubble. If the developed cavities fall apart, the effect on the stratum corneum lipids will increase the permeability of the skin. These areas of increased permeability are often called localized transport regions, where there is lower electrical resistivity. One potential method is to use cavitation seed at the surface of the skin. Another potential method is to use ultrasound-responsive liquid-core nuclei (URLN).

=== Frequency ===
Low-frequency ultrasound is seen as the optimal level of ultrasound frequency. This is typically characterized as 20 to 100 kHz (sometimes 18 to 100 kHz). Low frequency makes cavitation more likely. For reference, high frequency ultrasound is typically in the range of 1 to 3 MHz.

=== Coupling agents ===
The drug should be able to work together with the coupling agent. In a 2019 study, they used the drug diclofenac in coordination with thiocolchioside gel to treat patients who suffer from acute lower back pain. An application of a drug serving as a coupling agent is the use of piroxicam gel mixtures and dexamethasone sodium phosphate gel mixtures to treat patients who suffer from carpal tunnel syndrome.

== Applications ==
=== Physical conditions ===
Various conditions that can be addressed include cervical spine pain, acute lower back pain, carpal tunnel syndrome, muscle injury, rheumatoid arthritis, and venous thrombosis. Examples of drugs that have been used with sonophoresis include hydrocortisone, mannitol, dexamethasone, and lidocaine.

Several products have been marketed to use phonophoresis for transdermal drug delivery.

=== Other uses ===
A potential future application of phonophoresis is to use it with vaccines, as phonophoresis is considered a less painful alternative to needles. Another potential use is in cancer therapeutics; one such application that has been explored is the delivery of cisplatin for patients who have cervical cancer. Genetic skin diseases and wound healing may be assisted by phonophoresis.

== Future potential and other applications ==
Regarding high frequency sonophoresis (HFS), the future potential is very similar to its usage in the past. Many of the treatments involving HFS are topical and regional. Commonly used drugs in these topical applications include anti-inflammatory medications such as cortisol and dexamethasone. However, there has been a notable shift towards using non-steroidal anti-inflammatory drugs (NSAIDs), such as ibuprofen and ketoprofen. NSAIDs commonly cause gastrointestinal side effects such as nausea and heartburn, which can all be bypassed by delivering NSAIDs using sonophoresis. With its credible safety and useful ability in penetrating the stratum corneum, HFS remains an incredibly versatile option for delivering drugs topically. Low frequency sonophoresis (LFS), on the other hand, has a variety of applications that can be built upon in the future. Since LFS is not restricted by its ability to deliver molecules of varying sizes, drugs such as proteins, nanoparticles, and vaccines are all possible targets.

=== Ocular delivery ===
In previous literature, it has been demonstrated that ocular delivery of drugs can be achieved with high efficacy and minimal invasion. With 20 kHz ultrasound waves at an average temporal intensity of 2 W/cm^2applied every second, the permeability of drugs with varying lipophilicity were investigated, such as atenolol and carteolol, increased by 2.6 and 2.8-fold respectively.

=== Topical gene therapy ===
Topical gene therapy is another area for investigation in combination with sonophoresis. Since there exists a need to enhance gene transfer into cells, sonophoresis has the ability to achieve higher transfection rate through acoustic cavitation. Additionally, there is the advancement of using microbubbles with a contrast agent to diagnostically image the brain, as LFS and cavitation allows for disruption of the blood brain barrier. Gene therapy using ultrasound and microbubbles is also being investigated for ocular disease. In cardiovascular disease, for example, the efficiency of gene therapy can be improved by ultrasound targeted microbubble destruction where a gene-loaded microbubble can be burst to release its contents.

=== Challenges ===
Research being done on sonophoresis is poorly standardized. For example, the emission of ultrasound waves further away from the source results in a greater beam area, which drastically changes the ultrasound energy at the targeted area. More challenges surround the cost of the actual ultrasound devices used in sonophoresis in more clinical settings. There still yet exists a low-cost device with high efficacy. Additionally the precise mechanisms as to how sonophoresis works is currently yet to be discovered. Further research into the mechanisms, and the dominant mechanisms, can allow for better optimization of sonophoresis parameters, which will increase the efficacy of treatments.

Areas of sonophoretic research include the application of various drugs, dual-frequency sonophoresis, combined transdermal drug delivery techniques, and the use of nanoparticles to carry drugs.

At an optimal frequency, phonophoresis will be painless and have minimal to no risk. The heat that is emitted from ultrasound use can also be damaging to the surface of the skin, and cavitation can potentially lead to tissue damage. Nanoparticle toxicity is another potential risk.
