= Index of physics articles (A) =

The index of physics articles is split into multiple pages due to its size.

To navigate by individual letter use the table of contents below.

== A ==
- A. Baha Balantekin
- A. Carl Helmholz
- A. Catrina Bryce
- A. E. Becquerel
- A. G. Doroshkevich
- A. I. Shlyakhter
- A. K. Jonscher
- A. P. Balachandran
- A15 phases
- ABINIT
- ACE (CERN)
- ACS Nano
- AD1 experiment
- AD2 experiment
- AD3 experiment
- AD4 experiment
- AD5 experiment
- AD6 experiment
- ADA collider
- ADHM construction
- ADITYA (tokamak)
- ADM energy
- ADM formalism
- ADONE
- Advanced Simulation Library
- AEGIS (particle physics)
- AIDA (computing)
- AILU
- AIP Conference Proceedings
- AKLT Model
- ALBA (synchrotron)
- ALEPH experiment
- ALICE (accelerator)
- ALPHA Collaboration
- AMBER
- AMOLF
- ANNNI model
- ANTARES (accelerator)
- ANTARES (telescope)
- APEXC
- ARC-ECRIS
- ARGUS (experiment)
- ARGUS distribution
- ARROW waveguide
- ASACUSA
- ASA Gold Medal
- ASA Silver Medal
- ASDEX Upgrade
- ASTM Subcommittee E20.02 on Radiation Thermometry
- ASTRA (reactor)
- ASTRID 2
- ATHENA
- ATLAS Collaboration
- ATLAS experiment
- ATOMKI
- ATRAP
- AUSM
- A Brief History of Time
- A Briefer History of Time (Hawking and Mlodinow book)
- A Different Universe
- A Dynamical Theory of the Electromagnetic Field
- A Large Ion Collider Experiment
- A New Theory of Magnetic Storms
- A Treatise on Electricity and Magnetism
- A Universe from Nothing
- A dynamical theory of the electromagnetic field
- Aage Bohr
- Aaldert Wapstra
- Aaron Klug
- Aaron Lemonick
- Abbe prism
- Abbe sine condition
- Abdel-Moniem El-Ganayni
- Abdul Qadeer Khan
- Abdul Rasul (Iraqi scientist)
- Abdullah Sadiq
- Abdus Salam
- Abeles matrix formalism
- Abell 520
- Aberdeen Tunnel Underground Laboratory
- Aberration of light
- Abhay Ashtekar
- Ablation
- Abner Shimony
- Abol-fath Khazeni
- About Time (book)
- Above threshold ionization
- Abraham (Avi) Loeb
- Abraham Alikhanov
- Abraham Bennet
- Abraham Esau
- Abraham Haskel Taub
- Abraham Katzir
- Abraham Pais
- Abraham Zelmanov
- Abraham–Lorentz force
- Abraham–Lorentz–Dirac force
- Abraham–Minkowski controversy
- Abram Ioffe
- Abrikosov vortex
- Absolute angular momentum
- Absolute dating
- Absolute horizon
- Absolute magnitude
- Absolute rotation
- Absolute theory
- Absolute threshold of hearing
- Absolute time and space
- Absolute zero
- Absorbed dose
- Absorber
- Absorption (acoustics)
- Absorption (electromagnetic radiation)
- Absorption band
- Absorption cross section
- Absorption curve
- Absorption edge
- Absorption refrigerator
- Absorption spectroscopy
- Absorption spectrum
- Abu'l-Barakāt al-Baghdādī
- Abundance of the chemical elements
- Accelerated reference frame
- Accelerating expansion of the universe
- Accelerating universe
- Acceleration
- Acceleration voltage
- Accelerator Test Facility (Japan)
- Accelerator Test Facility (New York)
- Accelerator mass spectrometry
- Accelerator physics
- Accelerometer
- Acceleron
- Acceptor (semiconductors)
- Accidental symmetry
- Accordion effect
- Accretion (astrophysics)
- Accretion disc
- Acentric factor
- Achim Richter
- Acicular ferrite
- Acoplanarity
- Acoustic Doppler Current Profiler
- Acoustic Doppler velocimetry
- Acoustic analogy
- Acoustic approximation
- Acoustic attenuation
- Acoustic cleaning
- Acoustic cloak
- Acoustic contrast factor
- Acoustic dispersion
- Acoustic droplet ejection
- Acoustic emission
- Acoustic holography
- Acoustic impedance
- Acoustic interferometer
- Acoustic levitation
- Acoustic location
- Acoustic lubrication
- Acoustic metamaterials
- Acoustic metric
- Acoustic microscopy
- Acoustic mirror
- Acoustic network
- Acoustic ohm
- Acoustic paramagnetic resonance
- Acoustic quieting
- Acoustic radiation force
- Acoustic radiation force impulse imaging
- Acoustic radiation pressure
- Acoustic resonance
- Acoustic rheometer
- Acoustic signature
- Acoustic source localization
- Acoustic streaming
- Acoustic suspension
- Acoustic theory
- Acoustic wave
- Acoustic wave equation
- Acoustical Society of America
- Acoustical engineering
- Acoustical measurements and instrumentation
- Acoustical oceanography
- Acoustics
- Acousto-optic deflector
- Acousto-optics
- Acta Biochimica et Biophysica Sinica
- Acta Biomaterialia
- Acta Crystallographica
- Acta Crystallographica A
- Acta Crystallographica B
- Acta Crystallographica C
- Acta Crystallographica D
- Acta Crystallographica E
- Acta Crystallographica F
- Acta Materialia
- Acta Physica Polonica
- Acta Physica Polonica A
- Acta Physica Polonica B
- Actinic light
- Actinide
- Actinides in the environment
- Actinism
- Actinometer
- Action-angle coordinates
- Action (physics)
- Action at a distance (physics)
- Activation analysis
- Activation product
- Active and passive transformation
- Active cavity radiometer
- Active galactic nucleus
- Active laser medium
- AdS/CFT correspondence
- AdS/QCD
- AdS black hole
- Ad Lagendijk
- Adam Dziewonski
- Adam Falk
- Adam Riess
- Adaptive compliant wing
- Adaptive feedback cancellation
- Adaptive optics
- Added mass
- Additive white Gaussian noise
- Adelbert Ames, Jr.
- Adhémar Jean Claude Barré de Saint-Venant
- Adi Bulsara
- Adiabatic conductivity
- Adiabatic flame temperature
- Adiabatic invariant
- Adiabatic principle
- Adiabatic process
- Adiabatic process (quantum mechanics)
- Adiabatic shear band
- Adiabatic theorem
- Adinkra symbols (physics)
- Adjustable Ranging Telescope
- Adlène Hicheur
- Admittance
- Adolf Bestelmeyer
- Adolf Busemann
- Adolf Eugen Fick
- Adolf Kratzer
- Adolfo Bartoli
- Adriaan Fokker
- Adrian Bejan
- Adrian Berry, 4th Viscount Camrose
- Adriano de Paiva
- Adrien-Marie Legendre
- Advanced Composite Materials (journal)
- Advanced Light Source
- Advanced Photon Source
- Advanced Spaceborne Thermal Emission and Reflection Radiometer
- Advanced Thin Ionization Calorimeter
- Advanced boiling water reactor
- Advanced composite materials (science & engineering)
- Advances in Applied Clifford Algebras
- Advances in Physics
- Advances in Space Research
- Advances in Theoretical and Mathematical Physics
- Advection
- Adverse pressure gradient
- Adverse yaw
- Ady Stern
- Aeolipile
- Aeroacoustics
- Aerobraking
- Aerocapture
- Aerodynamic center
- Aerodynamic diameter
- Aerodynamic drag
- Aerodynamic force
- Aerodynamic heating
- Aerodynamic levitation
- Aerodynamic potential flow code
- Aerodynamics
- Aeroelasticity
- Aerogel
- Aerographite
- Aerogravity assist
- Aerology
- Aeromechanics
- Aeronautics
- Aeroprediction
- Aerosol
- Aerosol impaction
- Aerostatics
- Aether (classical element)
- Aether drag hypothesis
- Aether theories
- Affleck–Dine mechanism
- Afshar experiment
- Afterglow plasma
- Age crisis
- Age of the Earth
- Age of the universe
- Aggregated diamond nanorod
- Agitator (device)
- Agnes Pockels
- Agrophysics
- Aharon Katzir
- Aharonov–Bohm effect
- Ahmet Yıldız
- Aichelburg–Sexl ultraboost
- Aileron
- Aimé Argand
- Aimé Cotton
- Air-mixing plenum
- Air (classical element)
- Air conditioning
- Air flow bench
- Air knife
- Air separation
- Air shower (physics)
- Air track
- Airborne wind turbine
- Aircraft dynamic modes
- Aircraft flight mechanics
- Aircraft noise
- Airfoil
- Airlift pump
- Airy beam
- Airy disk
- Airy wave theory
- Ajoy Ghatak
- Akeno Giant Air Shower Array
- Akitsune Imamura
- Akoustolith
- Al-Khazini
- Alain Aspect
- Alain Haché
- Alan Astbury
- Alan Boss
- Alan West Brewer
- Alan Cook
- Alan Cottrell
- Alan Guth
- Alan J. Heeger
- Alan Kostelecký
- Alan Lightman
- Alan Lloyd Hodgkin
- Alan M. Portis
- Alan Nunn May
- Alan Sokal
- Alan Tower Waterman
- Alan Walsh (physicist)
- Alastair G. W. Cameron
- Albedo
- Albert-László Barabási
- Albert Abraham Michelson
- Albert Baez
- Albert Allen Bartlett
- Albert Beaumont Wood
- Albert Betz
- Albert Bouwers
- Albert C. Geyser
- Albert Einstein
- Albert Einstein: Creator and Rebel
- Albert Einstein: The Practical Bohemian
- Albert Einstein Award
- Albert Einstein Medal
- Albert Einstein Science Park
- Albert Einstein World Award of Science
- Albert Einstein in popular culture
- Albert Fert
- Albert G. Hill
- Albert Messiah
- Albert Overhauser
- Albert Percival Rowe
- Albert Polman
- Albert Potter Wills
- Albert Rose (physicist)
- Albert Sauveur
- Albert Tarantola
- Albert Victor Bäcklund
- Albert von Ettingshausen
- Albrecht Fölsing
- Albrecht Unsöld
- Alcator C-Mod
- Alcubierre drive
- Aldert van der Ziel
- Alec Merrison
- Alejandro Corichi
- Aleksandar Despić
- Aleksandar Just
- Aleksander Akhiezer
- Aleksander Jabłoński
- Aleksander Zawadzki (naturalist)
- Aleksandr Andronov
- Aleksandr Chudakov
- Aleksandr Danilovich Aleksandrov
- Aleksandr Gurevich
- Aleksandr Leipunskii
- Aleksandr Stoletov
- Aleksei Pogorelov
- Aleksei Zinovyevich Petrov
- Alenush Terian
- Aleph (CERN)
- Alessandra Buonanno
- Alessandro Vaciago
- Alessandro Vespignani
- Alessandro Volta
- Alex Grossmann
- Alex Smith (engineer)
- Alex Stokes
- Alex Zettl
- Alex Zunger
- Alexander's band
- Alexander Akimov
- Alexander Alexeyevich Makarov
- Alexander Anderson (physicist)
- Alexander Animalu
- Alexander Balankin
- Alexander Behm
- Alexander Belavin
- Alexander Boksenberg
- Alexander Dalgarno
- Alexander Dallas Bache
- Alexander Davydov
- Alexander Eugen Conrady
- Alexander Fetter
- Alexander Friedmann
- Alexander Graham Bell
- Alexander Hollaender
- Alexander Hollaender Award in Biophysics
- Alexander Kuzemsky
- Alexander MacAulay
- Alexander Macfarlane
- Alexander Markovich Polyakov
- Alexander Meissner
- Alexander Mikhajlovich Baldin
- Alexander Nikuradse
- Alexander Patashinski
- Alexander Prokhorov
- Alexander R. Hamilton
- Alexander Rich
- Alexander S. Potupa
- Alexander Shikov
- Alexander Stepanovich Popov
- Alexander Vilenkin
- Alexander William Bickerton
- Alexander Zamolodchikov
- Alexander van Oudenaarden
- Alexandre Chorin
- Alexandru Marin (physicist)
- Alexandru Proca
- Alexei Alexeyevich Abrikosov
- Alexei Yuryevich Smirnov
- Alexei Zamolodchikov
- Alexey Andreevich Anselm
- Alexey Kavokin
- Alexis-Marie de Rochon
- Alexis Clairaut
- Alexis Thérèse Petit
- Alf Adams
- Alfons Bühl
- Alfred-Marie Liénard
- Alfred Barnard Basset
- Alfred Bucherer
- Alfred Hubler
- Alfred Kastler
- Alfred Kleiner
- Alfred Landé
- Alfred Lauck Parson
- Alfred M. Mayer
- Alfred O. C. Nier
- Alfred Perot
- Alfred Robb
- Alfred Saupe
- Alfred Schild
- Alfred Wegener
- Alfred Wilm
- Alfvén-Klein model
- Alfvén wave
- Algebra of physical space
- Algebraic holography
- Algodoo
- AliEn (ALICE Environment)
- Ali Javan
- Ali Moustafa Mosharafa
- Alice Leigh-Smith
- Alkali-metal thermal to electric converter
- All-Union Institute for Scientific and Technical Information
- All-silica fiber
- All gas-phase iodine laser
- Allais effect
- Allan Blaer
- Allan Boardman
- Allan Carswell
- Allan Mackintosh
- Allan McLeod Cormack
- Allan V. Cox
- Allen Shenstone
- Allyn Vine
- Allyne L. Merrill
- Aloyzas Sakalas
- Alpha-particle spectroscopy
- Alpha & Omega (book)
- Alpha Magnetic Spectrometer
- Alpha decay
- Alpha factor
- Alpha particle
- Alpha process
- Alpher–Bethe–Gamow paper
- Alternating Gradient Synchrotron
- Alternatives to general relativity
- Alternatives to the Standard Model Higgs
- Aluminium gallium phosphide
- Alv Egeland
- Alvarez Physics Memo
- Alvarez Physics Memos
- Alvin Andreas Herborg Nielsen
- Alvin C. Graves
- Alvin M. Weinberg
- Alvin Radkowsky
- Alwyn Van der Merwe
- Amagat
- Amagat's law
- Amal Kumar Raychaudhuri
- Amasa Stone Bishop
- Ambient noise level
- Ambient pressure
- Ambipolar diffusion
- Amer Iqbal
- American Association of Physicists in Medicine
- American Association of Physics Teachers
- American Astron. Soc. Meeting
- American Astronomical Society
- American Geophysical Union
- American Institute of Physics
- American Journal of Physics
- American Physical Society
- American Prometheus
- American Vacuum Society
- Ames Laboratory
- Ames trapezoid
- Amikam Aharoni
- Amir Caldeira
- Ammonium diuranate
- Ammonium uranyl carbonate
- Amorphous ice
- Amorphous metal
- Amorphous solid
- Amory Lovins
- Amos Ori
- Amos de-Shalit
- Amott test
- Amount of substance
- Ampere
- Ampere-turn
- Ampere model of magnetization
- Amphidromic point
- Amplified spontaneous emission
- Amplitude
- Amplitude damping channel
- Ampère's circuital law
- Ampère's force law
- Amrom Harry Katz
- Amsterdam Density Functional
- An Album of Fluid Motion
- An Elementary Treatise on Electricity
- An Essay on the Application of Mathematical Analysis to the Theories of Electricity and Magnetism
- An Exceptionally Simple Theory of Everything
- An Inquiry Concerning the Source of the Heat Which Is Excited by Friction
- Ana María Cetto
- Anales de Física
- Analog Integrated Circuits and Signal Processing
- Analog models of gravity
- Analysis of flows
- Analytical dynamics
- Analytical mechanics
- Anastigmat
- Anatol Roshko
- Anatole Abragam
- Anatole Boris Volkov
- Anatoli Blagonravov
- Anatoly Dyatlov
- Anatoly Larkin
- Anatoly Petrovich Alexandrov
- Anatoly Vlasov
- Anatoly Zhabotinsky
- Anaxagoras
- Anaximander
- Anders Boserup
- Anders Flodström
- Anders Johan Lexell
- Anders Jonas Ångström
- Anders Karlsson (physicist)
- Anders Knutsson Ångström
- Anderson's rule
- Anderson impurity model
- Anderson localization
- Anderson orthogonality theorem
- Andre Geim
- Andrea Alù
- Andrea M. Ghez
- Andrea Naccari
- Andrea Prosperetti
- Andreas Acrivos
- Andreas Albrecht (cosmologist)
- Andreas Gerasimos Michalitsianos
- Andreas Jaszlinszky
- Andreas Mershin
- Andreas Winter
- Andreas von Ettingshausen
- Andreev reflection
- Andrei Linde
- Andrei Sakharov
- Andrej Čadež
- Andrew E. Lange
- Andrew Gordon (Benedictine)
- Andrew Gray (physicist)
- Andrew Huxley
- Andrew J. Feustel
- Andrew Keller
- Andrew Lang (physicist)
- Andrew Lowe (astronomer)
- Andrew Lyne
- Andrew R. Liddle
- Andrew Steane
- Andrew Strominger
- Andrew Turberfield
- Andrey Kolmogorov
- Andreyev Acoustics Institute
- Andrija Mohorovičić
- Andrius Baltuška
- Andromeda–Milky Way collision
- Andrzej Kajetan Wróblewski
- Andrzej Sołtan
- Andrzej Trautman
- André-Marie Ampère
- André Blondel
- André Guinier
- André Lichnerowicz
- André Maréchal
- André Neveu
- André Pochan
- Anechoic chamber
- Aneesur Rahman
- Anello Di Accumulazione
- Anemometer
- Aneutronic fusion
- Ángel Rodríguez Lozano
- Angelo Battelli
- Angioletta Coradini
- Angle-resolved photoemission spectroscopy
- Angle of attack
- Angle of climb
- Angle of incidence
- Angle of refraction
- Angle of repose
- Angstrom
- Angstrom exponent
- Angular Momentum Commutator
- Angular acceleration
- Angular diameter distance
- Angular displacement
- Angular frequency
- Angular momentum
- Angular momentum commutator
- Angular momentum coupling
- Angular momentum of light
- Angular momentum operator
- Angular size redshift relation
- Angular spectrum method
- Angular velocity
- Anharmonicity
- Anil Bhardwaj
- Animal echolocation
- Anirudh Singh (activist)
- Anisothermal plasma
- Anisotropic liquid
- Anita Goel
- Ann Nelson
- Anna Maria Nobili
- Annalen der Physik
- Annales Henri Poincaré
- Annales de chimie et de physique
- Annals of Physics
- Annealed disorder
- Annihilation
- Annular dark-field imaging
- Annular fin
- Annular velocity
- Annus Mirabilis papers
- Annus mirabilis
- Anode ray
- Anomalon
- Anomalous Diffraction Theory
- Anomalous X-ray pulsar
- Anomalous cosmic ray
- Anomalous diffusion
- Anomalous electric dipole moment
- Anomalous magnetic dipole moment
- Anomalous photovoltaic effect
- Anomalous scaling dimension
- Anomaly (physics)
- Anomaly matching condition
- Anosov diffeomorphism
- Ansar Pervaiz
- Ansatz
- Anselmus de Boodt
- Antarctic Impulse Transient Antenna
- Antarctic Muon And Neutrino Detector Array
- Antenn. Wireless Propag. Lett.
- Antenn. Wireless Propag. Lett. IEEE
- Antenn Wireless Propag Lett, IEEE
- Antenna array (electromagnetic)
- Antenna noise temperature
- Antennas and Wireless Propagation Letters (IEEE)
- Anthelion
- Anthony E. Siegman
- Anthony French
- Anthony Ichiro Sanda
- Anthony J. DeMaria
- Anthony James Leggett
- Anthony Kelly (academic)
- Anthony M. Johnson
- Anthony Zee
- Anthropic principle
- Anti-gravity
- Anti-laser
- Anti-phase domain
- Anti-reflective coating
- Anti-scatter grid
- Anti-scratch coating
- Anti-shock body
- Anti-vibration compound
- Anti-de Sitter space
- Antibubble
- Anticrepuscular rays
- Antidynamo theorem
- Antiferroelectricity
- Antiferromagnetic interaction
- Antiferromagnetism
- Antigluon
- Antihydrogen
- Antimatter
- Antimatter catalyzed nuclear pulse propulsion
- Antimatter comet
- Antimatter rocket
- Antimatter tests of Lorentz violation
- Antimatter weapon
- Antimo Palano
- Antineutrino
- Antineutron
- Antinucleon
- Antiparticle
- Antiphase
- Antiphoton
- Antiproton
- Antiproton Decelerator
- Antiprotonic helium
- Antiquarian science books
- Antistatic agent
- Antistatic wrist strap
- Antoine César Becquerel
- Antoine de Chézy
- Anton Ambschel
- Anton Kapustin
- Anton Maria Schyrleus of Rheita
- Anton Oberbeck
- Anton Peterlin (physicist)
- Anton Zeilinger
- Antonia Terzi
- Antonie van Leeuwenhoek
- Antonino Zichichi
- Antonio Ferri
- Antonio Pacinotti
- Antonio Signorini (physicist)
- Antonio Zichichi
- Antonius van den Broek
- Antony Garrett Lisi
- Antony Hewish
- Antony Jameson
- Antony Valentini
- Antun Karlo Bakotić
- Anwar Ali (scientist)
- Anyon
- Ányos Jedlik
- Apache Point Observatory Galactic Evolution Experiment
- Apache Point Observatory Lunar Laser-ranging Operation
- Aperture
- Apollo M. O. Smith
- Apoorva D. Patel
- Apparent horizon
- Apparent magnitude
- Apparent viscosity
- Apparent weight
- Appell's equation of motion
- Application of tensor theory in physics
- Applications of the Stirling engine
- Applied Optics
- Applied physics
- Applied Physics A
- Applied Physics B
- Applied Physics Express
- Applied Physics Letters
- Applied Spectroscopy (journal)
- Applied Spectroscopy Reviews
- Applied mechanics
- Applied physics
- Applied spectroscopy
- Apse line
- Apsidal precession
- Apsis
- ArDM
- ArXiv
- Arago spot
- Arbitrary unit
- Arc suppression
- Archeops
- Archer's paradox
- Archibald Hill
- Archibald Howie
- Archibald Low
- Archie G. Worthing
- Archimedean point
- Archimedes
- Archimedes' principle
- Archimedes number
- Architectural acoustics
- Archive for Rational Mechanics and Analysis
- Archytas
- Arcminute Cosmology Bolometer Array Receiver
- Arctowski Medal
- Ardeshir Hosseinpour
- Area density
- Area rule
- Areal velocity
- Arend Joan Rutgers
- Areostationary orbit
- Areostationary satellite
- Areosynchronous orbit
- Areosynchronous satellite
- Argo (oceanography)
- Argonne Tandem Linear Accelerator System
- Argument of periapsis
- Argus laser
- Arie Andries Kruithof
- Arie Bodek
- Aristotelian physics
- Aristotelian theory of gravity
- Aristotle
- Arizona Accelerator Mass Spectrometry Laboratory
- Arkady Migdal
- Arlie Petters
- Armand de Waele
- Armature reaction drop
- Arne Bjerhammar
- Arno Allan Penzias
- Arnold Eucken
- Arnold Flammersfeld
- Arnold Kosevich
- Arnold Kramish
- Arnold Sommerfeld
- Arnold diffusion
- Arrayed waveguide grating
- Arrow of time
- Arseny Sokolov
- Arthur Ashkin
- Arthur B. C. Walker, Jr.
- Arthur B. McDonald
- Arthur C. Hardy
- Arthur Compton
- Arthur Covington
- Arthur Eddington
- Arthur Edward Ruark
- Arthur Erich Haas
- Arthur F. Turner
- Arthur Geoffrey Walker
- Arthur Gordon Webster
- Arthur H. Rosenfeld
- Arthur Iberall
- Arthur Jaffe
- Arthur Jeffrey Dempster
- Arthur Korn
- Arthur König
- Arthur L. Schawlow Prize in Laser Science
- Arthur Leonard Schawlow
- Arthur Louis Day
- Arthur Maitland
- Arthur Morin
- Arthur Nowick
- Arthur R. von Hippel
- Arthur Roberts (physicist)
- Arthur S. Lodge
- Arthur Schuster
- Arthur Scott King
- Arthur Stanley Mackenzie
- Arthur Stewart Eve
- Arthur W. Barton
- Arthur Wehnelt
- Arthur Wightman
- Arthur William Rucker
- Arthur Williams Wright
- Arthur Zajonc
- Arthur von Oettingen
- Artificial dielectric
- Artificial dielectrics
- Artificial disintegration
- Artificial gravity
- Artificial magnetic conductor
- Artificial photosynthesis
- Artificial wave
- Artur Ekert
- Artyom Alikhanian
- Arun K. Pati
- Arvind Rajaraman
- Aryeh Kaplan
- Asbestiform
- Ascher H. Shapiro
- Asher A. Friesem
- Asher Peres
- Ashesh Prosad Mitra
- Ashok Das
- Ashoke Sen
- Ashtekar variables
- Askaryan Radio Array
- Askaryan effect
- Aspect ratio (wing)
- Aspera European Astroparticle network
- Asperity (materials science)
- Aspheric lens
- Aspirator (pump)
- Associated Legendre polynomials
- Association of Los Alamos Scientists
- Astatic galvanometer
- Asterix IV laser
- Asteroseismology
- Astigmatism
- Astro Space Center (Russia)
- Astrochemistry
- Astron (fusion reactor)
- Astronautics
- Astronomia nova
- Astronomical seeing
- Astronomical spectroscopy
- Astronomical system of units
- Astronomy
- Astronomy & Astrophysics
- Astronomy & Geophysics
- Astronomy Letters
- Astronomy Reports
- Astronomy and Astrophysics Decadal Survey
- Astronomy and Geophysics
- Astroparticle Physics (journal)
- Astroparticle physics
- Astrophysical X-ray source
- Astrophysical plasma
- Astrophysics
- Astrophysics Data System
- Astrophysics Data Systems
- Astrophysics and Space Science
- Asymptotic freedom
- Asymptotic homogenization
- Asymptotically flat spacetime
- Asım Orhan Barut
- Atacama Large Millimeter Array
- Ataç İmamoğlu
- Athene Donald
- Atkinson friction factor
- Atkinson resistance
- Atmosphere
- Atmosphere of Earth
- Atmosphere of Titan
- Atmosphere of Uranus
- Atmospheric-pressure chemical ionization
- Atmospheric-pressure plasma
- Atmospheric Radiation Measurement
- Atmospheric diffraction
- Atmospheric duct
- Atmospheric ducting
- Atmospheric dynamo
- Atmospheric electricity
- Atmospheric entry
- Atmospheric methane
- Atmospheric physics
- Atmospheric pressure
- Atmospheric pressure discharge
- Atmospheric radiative transfer codes
- Atmospheric refraction
- Atmospheric sciences
- Atmospheric sounding
- Atmospheric stratification
- Atmospheric thermodynamics
- Atmospheric wave
- Atom
- Atom: Journey Across the Subatomic Cosmos
- Atom laser
- Atom optics
- Atom probe
- Atom vibrations
- Atomic, molecular, and optical physics
- Atomic Emission Spectrum
- Atomic Energy of Canada Limited
- Atomic and molecular astrophysics
- Atomic battery
- Atomic beam
- Atomic clock
- Atomic coherence
- Atomic diffusion
- Atomic electron configuration table
- Atomic electron transition
- Atomic emission spectrum
- Atomic force microscopy
- Atomic form factor
- Atomic fountain
- Atomic gas
- Atomic line filter
- Atomic mass unit
- Atomic mirror
- Atomic nucleus
- Atomic number
- Atomic orbital
- Atomic orbital model
- Atomic packing factor
- Atomic percent
- Atomic physics
- Atomic ratio
- Atomic scale
- Atomic scales
- Atomic spacing
- Atomic spectral line
- Atomic theory
- Atomic units
- Atomichron
- Atomics International
- Atomism
- Atomistix Virtual NanoLab
- Attenuation
- Attenuation (electromagnetic radiation)
- Attenuation coefficient
- Attenuation length
- Attophysics
- Attosecond physics
- Atwood machine
- Atwood number
- Audio frequency
- Audio power
- Aufbau principle
- Auger effect
- Auger electron spectroscopy
- August Beer
- August H. Pfund
- August Herman Pfund
- August Krönig
- August Kundt
- August Musger
- August Seebeck
- August Seydler
- August Toepler
- August Witkowski
- Auguste Bravais
- Auguste Piccard
- Augustin-Jean Fresnel
- Augustin-Louis Cauchy
- Augusto Righi
- Augustus William Smith
- Aureole effect
- Aurora (astronomy)
- Aurora of November 17, 1882
- Auroral chorus
- Austin Model 1
- Australian Atomic Energy Commission
- Australian Journal of Physics
- Australian Nuclear Science and Technology Organisation
- Australian Synchrotron
- Autler–Townes effect
- Autocollimation
- Autocollimator
- Autodynamics
- Automated Radioxenon Sampler Analyzer
- Automatic calculation of particle interaction or decay
- Automobile drag coefficient
- Autonomous system (mathematics)
- Autorotation (helicopter)
- Autostereoscopy
- Auxetics
- Auxiliary field
- Auxiliary field Monte Carlo
- Available energy (particle collision)
- Avalanche breakdown
- Avery Gilbert
- Avishai Dekel
- Avogadro's law
- Avrami equation
- Avshalom Elitzur
- Axel Scherer
- Axel T. Brunger
- Axial-flow pump
- Axial multipole moments
- Axial pen force
- Axial precession
- Axial ratio
- Axial tilt
- Axiality and rhombicity
- Axicon
- Axilrod–Teller potential
- Axino
- Axiomatic quantum field theory
- Axion
- Azeotrope
- Azimuthal quantum number
