= Zelmanov =

Zelmanov is a Russian surname. Notable people with the surname include:

- Abraham Zelmanov (1913–1987), Soviet physicist
- Efim Zelmanov (born 1955), Russian-American mathematician

== See also ==
- Želmanovce
