= Katzir (surname) =

Katzir is a surname. Notable people with the surname include:

- Abraham Katzir (born 1941), Israeli physicist
- Aharon Katzir (1914–1972), Israeli biophysicist
- Ephraim Katzir (1916–2009), Israeli biophysicist, politician and President of Israel
- Hanna Katzir (1948–2024), Israeli kindergarten teacher and hostage survivor
- Mor Katzir (born 1980), Israeli model
- Nina Katzir (1914–1986), Israeli teacher, wife of Ephraim

== See also ==
- Katzir (disambiguation)
