= Advanced composite materials =

Advanced composite materials refers to the following titles:

- Advanced composite materials (science & engineering)
- Advanced Composite Materials (journal)
