= AD 2 =

AD 2 may refer to:

- A year of the 0s decade in the Julian calendar
- Ad 2, a division of the American Advertising Federation
- USS Melville (AD-2), a US Navy destroyer tender
- AD-2 Skyraider, an American attack aircraft
- AD-2 experiment, a collaboration to create antihydrogen
- AD-2 Ambush, a solid-rocket-motor interceptor developed by Helsing
