= Tsvi Piran =

Israeli theoretical physicist and astrophysicist (born 1949)

- צבי פיראן
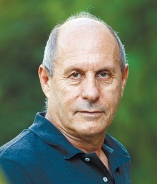
- Born: May 6, 1949 (age 77); Tel Aviv, Israel
- Education: The Hebrew University of Jerusalem
- Spouse: Dalia S. Goldwirth
- Awards: The EMET Prize for Art, Science and Culture
- Scientific career
- Fields: Theoretical Physics and Astrophysics
- Workplaces: The Hebrew University of Jerusalem
- Doctoral advisor: Jacob Shaham and Joseph Katz
- Notable students: Amos Ori

Tsvi Piran (Hebrew: צבי פיראן; born May 6, 1949) is an Israeli theoretical physicist and astrophysicist, best known for his work on Gamma-ray Bursts (GRBs) and on numerical relativity. The recipient of the 2019 EMET prize award in Physics and Space Research.

At a time when most astronomers believed that GRBs were galactic (see however an earlier suggestion by Bohdan Paczynski) with Eichler, Livio and Schramm, Piran proposed that GRBs originate from cosmological neutron star binary mergers, a model that is generally accepted today. During the early nineties when the cosmological vs. galactic debate took place, Piran was a prominent proponent of a cosmological origin, which was confirmed in 1997 with the discovery of cosmological redshifts from GRB's afterglow. Before the cosmological origin of GRBs was confirmed, Piran co-developed the cosmic fireball model. He suggested that GRBs indicate the formation of a black hole. Later on, together with Re'em Sari and other collaborators, Piran further developed the theory of GRB afterglows, and of GRB jets.

Before working on GRBs, Piran worked on numerical relativity, the numerical solution of Einstein's equations. In 1985 he wrote the first numerical code calculating the collapse and formation of a rotating black hole and the resulting gravitational radiation waveform. This waveform shows relaxation towards the quasinormal modes of the black hole that forms. Detection of this waveform by advanced gravitational radiation detectors may provide evidence for the existence of a black hole.

In addition to these works, Piran's contributions range over a selection of problems in relativistic astrophysics. He demonstrated the critical dependence of the stability of accretion disks on the cooling and heating mechanisms. Piran was the first to point out that inflation is a generic phenomenon involving any scalar field (without requiring a specific potential) and, in particular, that this is so for a free massive scalar field. He went on later to show that, in fact, the onset of inflation is not fully generic and it requires specific initial conditions, He was the first to suggest and show that cosmic biasing depends on galaxy types and that different galaxies are distributed differently in the Universe. The concept was controversial when proposed in the late eighties. Piran's work also includes contributions to the general theory of relativity, such as providing a counterexample to the cosmic censorship hypothesis and the demonstration of the instability of the inner structure of a black hole.

In addition to Piran's work as an astrophysicist, he has served from 2005 until 2009 as the dean of the Hebrew University School of Business Administration. During this term he has made revisions in the school.

== Chronology ==
- 1967-1970: (undergraduate student) Mathematics and Physics, Tel Aviv University
- 1970-1972: Military Service and MSc studies Space Sciences, Tel Aviv University under the guidance of A. Eviatar.
- 1970-1976: Military Service and PhD thesis under the supervision of J. Shaham and J. Katz at the Hebrew University of Jerusalem: Penrose process and on modeling of GRBs from instabilities around black holes.
- 1976-1977: Research Associate at Oxford with Dennis Sciama's group: accretion disks instabilities and winds
- 1977-1979: Research associate and later Assistant Prof. at the University of Texas at Austin with Bryce DeWitt's group: foundation of Numerical Relativity, jets in AGNs.
- 1980-1987: Long-term member at the Institute for Advanced Study in Princeton, NJ and a faculty at the Hebrew University of Jerusalem: Numerical Relativity, Rotating gravitational collapse, Inflation, Galaxy biasing, neutrinos from SN 1987A
- 1988-1990: The Hebrew University: Gamma-ray Bursts
- 1990-1993: CFA Harvard: Gamma-Ray Bursts
- 1998-1999: Visiting Prof. Columbia University and NYU
- 2000- :Astronomical limits on Lorentz invariance violation
- 2004-2005: Moore Scholar Caltech
- 2005-2009: Dean Hebrew University School of Business Administration
- 2009- :ERC Advanced Research Grant

== Honors ==
- Landau Prize for a distinguished PhD thesis - 1976
- Distinguished Moore Fellowship Caltech - 2005
- ERC Advanced Research Grant - 2009
- ERC Advanced Research Grant - 2016
- EMET Prize, Israel, 2019
