= Friction factor =

Friction factor may refer to:

- Atkinson friction factor, a measure of the resistance to airflow of a duct
- Darcy friction factor, in fluid dynamics
- Fanning friction factor, a dimensionless number used as a local parameter in continuum mechanics

== See also ==
- coefficient of friction
