= JSCM =

JSCM is an abbreviation for one of the following:

- Journal of Supply Chain Management
- Japan Society for Composite Materials
- Commendation Medal#Joint Service
