= Katzir (disambiguation) =

Katzir may refer to:

Places

- Katzir, a Jewish locality in northern Israel
- Katzir-Harish, an earlier town (local council) in the Haifa District of Israel. However, in 2012 the two were separated, with Harish remaining a local council and Katzir reverting to the jurisdiction of Menashe Regional Council
- Tel Katzir, a kibbutz in northern Israel

Persons

- Katzir (surname), persons with the surname

Others

- Katchalski-Katzir algorithm, algorithm for docking of rigid molecules, developed by Ephraim Katchalski/Katzir
