= Denis Hall =

British professor of photonics

Denis Hall FRSE FIEE FInstP FIEEE

Professor of Photonics, Heriot-Watt University
- Incumbent
- Assumed office 1987

Personal details

Denis R. Hall is a professor of photonics at Heriot-Watt University, Edinburgh. In 2004 he was awarded the Association of Laser Users award for his contributions to the development of industrial lasers and their applications.

== Education ==
Hall graduated in physics at the University of Manchester in 1965, and attained his MPhil in 1967 at London University for research in cell biology. He received a PhD in electrical engineering in 1971 from Case Western Reserve University in Cleveland, USA. He received an MBA degree at the Edinburgh Business School in 1996.

== Academic work ==
In 1971, Hall was awarded a National Academy of Sciences Fellowship at NASA Goddard Space Flight Center where he worked on for space-based optical communication systems. He then moved to Avco Everett Research Laboratory in Boston, where he worked on electron beam laser technology and high pulse energy modelocked lasers, laser radar and atmospheric optical propagation.

Hall moved to the Royal Signals and Radar Establishment in 1976 working on lasers and infrared systems, before transferring to the University of Hull in 1979. At Hull he led the UK national project to design and construct the Satellite Laser Ranging Facility at Royal Greenwich Observatory, Herstmonceux. At the same time Hall developed techniques for laser excitation using transverse radiofrequency discharges to produce a range of compact sealed CO_{2} lasers for medical, industrial and laser radar applications.

Since 1987, Hall has been Professor of Photonics at Heriot-Watt University, Edinburgh, where his research interests have continued in laser device physics and applications. He has been concerned with the design of ultracompact high power waveguide lasers, exploiting concurrent research in RF discharge physics and planar optical waveguides to develop new laser concepts based on 2-D laser power scaling and novel laser resonators. Planar waveguide CO_{2} lasers are now successful products manufactured by major international companies for applications in industry and medicine. More recently, the planar waveguide 'thin laser' concept has been extended to other gas lasers and to solid state lasers pumped by diode bars. This work, part of a general industrial orientation involving partnership in many industry/university collaborative research projects, has resulted in a series of new commercial laser devices and industrial laser-based systems. He has been involved in the creation of three successful start-up companies producing lasers and laser systems.

== Awards ==
Hall is the recipient of the 2004 AILU award for his contribution to the development of industrial lasers and their applications, especially work on the technology of the RF-excited diffusion-cooled CO_{2} laser.

He is a Fellow of the Royal Society of Edinburgh, the IEEE, the UK Institute of Physics, the IEE, and the Optical Society of America. He was Chairman of the UK Institute of Physics Quantum Electronics Group from 1990 to 1993, and was also Chairman of the European Physical Society Quantum Electronics and Optics Division (1998–2000). Currently, he is Deputy Principal (Pro-Vice Chancellor) with special responsibility for Research at Heriot-Watt University, operating on a part-time basis in parallel with research activity as Professor of Photonics in the School of Engineering and Physical Sciences. He is also Deputy Director of the Edinburgh Research Partnership between the University of Edinburgh and Heriot-Watt University.

== Sources ==
- https://www.phy.hw.ac.uk/contacts/Denis%20Hall.htm
- https://web.archive.org/web/20110903124814/http://www.ailu.org.uk/association/awards_and_prizes/ailu_awards/award/2004_denis_hall.html
