= Atkinson resistance =

Atkinson resistance is commonly used in mine ventilation to characterise the resistance to airflow of a duct of irregular size and shape, such as a mine roadway. It has the symbol $R$ and is used in the square law for pressure drop,

$$\Delta P = \frac{\rho_{actual}}{\rho_{ref}}RQ^2$$

where (in English units)

- $\Delta P$ is pressure drop (pounds per square foot),
- $\rho_{actual}$ is the air density in the duct (pounds per cubic foot),
- $\rho_{ref}$ is the standard air density (0.075 pound per cubic foot),
- $R$ is the resistance (atkinsons),
- $Q$ is the rate of flow of air (thousands of cubic feet per second).

One atkinson is defined as the resistance of an airway which, when air flows along it at a rate of 1,000 cubic feet per second, causes a pressure drop of one pound-force per square foot.

The unit is named after J J Atkinson, who published one of the earliest comprehensive mathematical treatments of mine ventilation. Atkinson based his expressions for airflow resistance on the more general work of Chézy and Darcy who defined frictional pressure drop as

$$\Delta P = \frac{1}{2}\rho f L \frac{S}{A}v^2$$

where

- $\Delta P$ is pressure drop,
- $\rho$ is the density of the fluid in question (water, air, oil etc.),
- $f$ is the Fanning friction factor,
- $L$ is the length of the duct,
- $S$ is the perimeter of the duct,
- $A$ is the area of the duct,
- $v$ is the velocity of the fluid.

The practicalities of mine ventilation led Atkinson to group some of these variables into one all-encompassing term:

- Area and perimeter were incorporated because mine airways are of irregular shape, and both vary along the length of an airway.
- velocity $v$ was replaced by the ratio of flowrate to area ($Q/A$) because variations in area cause variations in velocity. Area was then incorporated into the denominator of the Atkinson resistance term.
- Length of the airway was incorporated. This may have been a step too far, as most of his successors chose to give values of Atkinson resistance in terms of atkinsons per unit length (often 100 or 1,000 yards).
- The term $1/2\rho$ was incorporated, which later authors definitely considered a step too far (e.g. McPherson, 1988). In Atkinson's time not only were all British mines shallow enough that the density of air could be considered constant, but fan design was primitive enough that variations in density would make no measurable difference to the amount of motive power required. Atkinson did not foresee that his methods would be applied several miles underground, where air is 30–50% denser than it is at the surface. Density variations of this magnitude can alter the power consumption of colliery ventilation fans by hundreds of kilowatts.

The resulting term is one that can be easily calculated from the results of two simple measurements: a pressure survey by the gauge and tube method and a flowrate survey with a counting anemometer. This is a major strength and is the reason why Atkinson resistance remains in use today.

A complete definition of Atkinson resistance $R$ in more common fluid flow terms is as follows:

$$R = \frac{1}{2}\rho \frac{f L S}{A^3} \equiv \frac{1}{2}\rho\frac{f L}{R_{h} A^2} \equiv \frac{1}{2}\rho\frac{4 f L}{D_{h} A^2} \equiv \frac{1}{2}\rho\frac{\lambda L}{D_{h} A^2}$$

in which

- $R_{h}$ is hydraulic radius,
- $D_{h}$ is hydraulic diameter and
- $\lambda$ is Darcy friction factor

in addition to the terms defined above.

Atkinson also defined a friction factor (Atkinson friction factor) used for airways of fixed section such as shafts. It accounts for Fanning friction factor, density and the constant $1/2$ and relates to Atkinson resistance by

$$R = \frac{k L S}{A^3}$$

- where $k$ is Atkinson friction factor and the other terms are as defined above.

Despite its weakness with regards to density changes, the use of Atkinson resistance is so widespread in the mining industry that a corresponding term in metric units has also been defined. It, too, is termed the atkinson resistance but the unit was given the name gaul (for reasons unknown). The earliest known use of the name is a 1971 British Coal memorandum on metrication, VB/CIRC/71(26).

One gaul is defined as the resistance of an airway which, when air (of density 1.2 kg/m^{3}) flows along it at a rate of one cubic metre per second, causes a pressure drop of one pascal. The gaul has units of N·s^{2}/m^{8}, or alternatively Pa·s^{2}/m^{6}.

It uses the same basic equation as its Imperial counterpart, but with slightly different dimensions:

$$\Delta P = \frac{\rho_{actual}}{\rho_{ref}}RQ^2$$

where

- $\Delta P$ is pressure drop (pascals),
- $\rho_{actual}$ is the air density in the air duct (kilograms per cubic metre),
- $\rho_{ref}$ is the standard air density (1.2 kilograms per cubic metre),
- $R$ is the resistance of the air path (gauls),
- $Q$ is the rate of flow of air (cubic metres per second).

The metric and Imperial resistances are related by

$$1 \mbox{ gaul} = 1 \mbox{ atkinson} \times \frac{10^6 \times \left( \frac {metres}{feet} \right )^8}{\frac{kilograms}{pounds}\times g} \equiv 1 \times \frac{10^6 \times  0.3048^8}{0.4536\times 9.80665} \equiv 16.747 \mbox{ atkinsons}$$

where $g$ is the standard acceleration of gravity (metres per second squared).

The metric equivalent is now more widely used than the original Imperial definition. Most suppliers quote resistances of flexible temporary ventilation ducts in gauls/100 m and in most mine ventilation software programs, branch resistances are given in gauls.
