= Association of Los Alamos Scientists =

The Association of Los Alamos Scientists (ALAS) was founded on August 30, 1945, by a group of scientists, who had worked on the development of the atomic bomb at the Los Alamos Laboratory, a division of the Manhattan Project.

== Purpose ==
The purpose of the organization was "to promote the attainment and use of scientific and technological advances in the best interests of humanity", according to the manifesto, available in the archives of the University of Chicago. The scientists believed that they, "by virtue of their special knowledge, have, in certain spheres, special political and social responsibilities beyond their obligations as individual citizens". The association sought to carry out these responsibilities by keeping its members informed, "and by providing a forum through which their views can be publicly and authoritatively expressed".

The ALAS concentrated its activities principally in promoting international control of nuclear power and directing it to peaceful uses. Its members also attempted to promote responsible uses of science, and the freedom and integrity of scientists and scientific research.

The group sponsored public education on the nature and control of atomic energy through lectures, films, and exhibits, and the distribution of literature. It also attempted to influence public policy by means of informed statements to the press and correspondence with high government officials and congressmen.

== Bibliography ==
- Richard Rhodes, The Making of the Atomic Bomb
- Robert Jungk, Brighter Than a Thousand Suns
