= Anti-vibration compound =

An anti-vibration compound is a temperature-resistant mixture of a liquid with fine particles, which is used to reduce oscillations in calender rolls and to dampen vibrations in fabricated structures like machine beds and housings.

== Use ==
Vibration may limit the performance of a calender or paper machine. It can have numerous sources such as bulk variations in the sheet, bearing problems, or misalignment of the driveshaft. Vibration manifests itself as a high frequency periodic movement of the roll body with an amplitude from less than one to several μm.

When anti-vibration compound is introduced to the center bores of the rolls, vibration is transferred from the solid roll structure to the incompressible fluid component of the anti-vibration compound. Its solid particles are less mobile due to their inertia. Thus the fluid is forced to oscillate around the solid components. The flow energy is absorbed by micro eddies by which the vibration is damped.

The benefits are a smoother running with increased operating speed and production, longer operating times of the polymer covers between re-grindings and improved product quality due to the reduction of barring.
