= Applied Spectroscopy Reviews =

- Discipline: Spectroscopy
- Language: English
- Edited by: Joseph Sneddon

Publication details
- History: 1967-present
- Publisher: Taylor and Francis
- Frequency: Bimonthly
- Impact factor: 5.917 (2020)

Standard abbreviations
- ISO 4: Appl. Spectrosc. Rev.

Indexing
- ISSN: 0570-4928 (print); 1520-569X (web)

Links
- Journal homepage; Online access; Online archive

Applied Spectroscopy Reviews is a peer-reviewed scientific journal that publishes review articles on all aspects of spectroscopy.

== Abstracting and indexing ==
The journal is abstracted and indexed by the Science Citation Index and Current Contents/Physical, Chemical & Earth Sciences.
