= Alexander Shlyakhter =

Alexander Isaakovich Shlyakhter (Russian: Александр Исаакович Шляхтер; died June 2000) was a Russian nuclear physicist and risk analyst.

Shlyakhter is best known for discovering empirical evidence for the constancy of fundamental constants. While still a student in Leningrad, he observed that the products of past nuclear reactions at a natural nuclear fission reactor at Oklo, Gabon demonstrate that the fine-structure constant α has changed less than 10^{−17} per year over the last two billion years. He published the finding in a letter to Nature in 1976. Freeman Dyson later wrote that Shlyakhter had "revolutionized the subject" of variation in physical constants.

In 1987 Shlyakhter became a research fellow in Richard Wilson's laboratory at Harvard University. His later work was in risk assessment, and included notable analyses of global warming, nuclear security and the Chernobyl disaster. He died of cancer in June 2000.
