= Acoustic approximation =

Principle of acoustics

In acoustics, the acoustic approximation is a fundamental principle that states that an acoustic wave is created by a small, adiabatic, pressure ripple riding on a comparatively large equilibrium (bias) pressure. Typically, the acoustic pressure is on the order of a few ppm of the equilibrium pressure.

By extension, the acoustic approximation also guarantees that an acoustic wave travels at a speed exactly equal to the local speed of sound.

However, "in rough media, acoustic waves can only be a poor-quality approximation of elastic waves."
