= Anton Ambschel =

Slovenian scientist and philosopher

Anton Ambschel (also often spelled as Ambschl, Ambschell, Ambšl) (1 December 1746 in Cerknica, Slovenia – 14 July 1821 in Bratislava, Slovakia) was a Slovenian mathematician, physicist, philosopher and astronomer.

Much like Jakob Štelin, Martin Kuralt and Franz Samuel Karpe, he was one of the major Slovene Enlightenment philosophers from the seventeenth century and the eighteenth century. He wrote in Latin and later did so in German as well.

In 1778, he entered the Jesuits. Between 1773 and 1785, he worked as a public and full professor of physics on the Jesuits board in Ljubljana. Until 1785, he was also a board chancellor but was later dismissed. He also worked as a professor of physics and mechanics at the University of Vienna until 1803. He was a member of Academia Operosorum Labacensium.

Although he was a physicist, his most prominent work in German, Anfangsgruende der allgemeinen auf Erscheinungen und Versuche gebauten Naturlehre I-VI, was established via Liebniz-Wolff rationalism. With this book, he renounced his scholasticism, established nature empirically and formulated physics as being literary for describing the effects between bodies.
