= Artificial disintegration =

Term for breaking down an atomic nucleus

Artificial disintegration is the term coined by Ernest Rutherford for the process by which an atomic nucleus is broken down by bombarding it with high speed alpha particles, either from a particle accelerator, or a naturally decaying radioactive substance such as radium, as Rutherford originally used.

== See also ==
- Nuclear fission
- The Fly in the Cathedral
