= Antimo Palano =

Antimo Palano is one of the Italian and international leading experts of hadron spectroscopy.

== Biography ==
After attaining his degree in physics in 1972, he participated in the WA76-OMEGA experiment at CERN; he was also appointed as spokesman of that experiment. Palano participated in the BaBar experiment, at SLAC laboratories, Stanford University. He is currently Full Professor of Physics at the University of Bari.

In 2003 he discovered a new particle, dubbed D_{s0}*(2317), unexpected resonance constituted by a charm quark and a strange quark. In the paper in which the discovery of the new particle was reported, there is also an indication about the possible existence of another particle with a mass of about 2460 MeV, the so-called D_{s1}(2460), subsequently confirmed by the Belle experiment, at the KEK laboratories, in Japan.
