= Arthur Maitland =

Arthur Maitland was born on 7 December 1928 in Blackburn, England. He gained his BSc Physics degree in 1956 as a part-time student studying for a London University External Degree. In 1972 at St Andrews University, whom he was employed as a researcher and lecturer in 1963, awarded him a DSc degree on the basis of his published papers on ionised gases. At the time he was also working for several electrical engineering companies. He was an influential figure, founding the laser research department at St Andrews University in 1964. He led a group of 14 physicists there working in the areas of lasers and their applications, gas discharge tubes, ionised gases, optical methods of signal processing, and applications of ionised gases to fast switching (see Thyratrons). He became Professor of Physics at St Andrews in 1993.

Professor Maitland was a fellow of the Institute of Physics, and published over 40 research papers on lasers, ionised gases and fast switching, and was co-author of Laser Physics (North Holland), Vacuum as an Insulator (Chapman and Hall) and posthumously contributing a chapter to High Voltage Vacuum Insulation (Academic Press). He also held 40 patents and was a consultant for the gas tubes division of EEV Co., Chelmsford, England and Nobel's Explosives Company Ltd. He died of cancer on 30 June 1994, aged 65.

At St Andrews University, he very quickly established a group working on gas lasers. Professor Maitland recognised that the gas-discharge laser had enormous potential for practical use. Through his ground breaking research into the physics of gas-discharge lasers, Professor Maitland invented several methods for generating gas-discharge based lasers.

Professor Arthur Maitland is credited with the invention of apparatus capable of forming a beam of electrons.
