= Atmospheric pressure discharge =

Electrical current through air or another gas

An atmospheric pressure discharge is an electrical discharge in air or another gas at atmospheric pressure.

An electrical discharge in a gas forms plasma. Plasmas are sustained if there is a continuous inflow of energy to maintain the required degree of ionization by counterbalancing the recombination events that lead to extinction of the discharge. The number of recombination events per unit time and per unit volume is proportional to the density of each recombining plasma species (ions and electrons) and, thus, grows fast with the gas pressure. Therefore, compared to lower-pressure discharges, atmospheric discharges require a higher power to maintain.

Typical atmospheric discharges are:

- DC arc
- Lightning
- Atmospheric-pressure glow discharge
- Dielectric barrier discharge
