= André Pochan =

French physicist and mathematician (1891–1979)

André Pochan (5 July 1891 in Fourmies, France – 4 February 1979 in Le Cannet, France) was a French physicist and mathematician and Egyptology enthusiast. He taught at Cairo High School from 1930 to 1937. In 1934 he investigated the coloration of the Khufu and Khafre pyramids. Deported to Mauthausen in 1943, he survived the death camps and, as such, he was awarded the Medal of the Resistance and Commander of the Legion of Honor. His main research focused on the Egyptian pyramids, especially the Pyramid of Khufu, and he became known as a "highly independent pyramid scholar". His research was highly criticized by the Egyptologist Jean-Philippe Lauer. In 1971 he published L 'Enigme de la Grande Pyramide (Robert Laffont, Paris).
