= Asterix IV laser =

Iodine gas laser

The Asterix IV laser in Prague (commonly referred to by the acronym PALS for Prague Asterix Laser System) is a high power photolytically pumped iodine gas laser capable of producing ~300 to 500 picosecond long pulses of light at the fundamental line of 1.315 micrometres wavelength with a total energy of about 1 kilojoule (or tripled to the third harmonic at 438 nanometers with lower pulse energies) and peak powers of around 3 terawatts. There are also two smaller auxiliary beams capable of producing 100 J pulses. One of the research topics is X-ray generation in laser excited plasma.

Asterix IV was originally developed, built and operated at the Max Planck Institute of Quantum Optics (MPQ) in Garching, Germany. The Laser Plasmas division of Prof. Witkowski operated the laser at MPQ from 1991 until May 1997. In 1999 it was reassembled in Prague and put into operation again on 8 June 2000.

PALS is open to both domestic and foreign researchers.

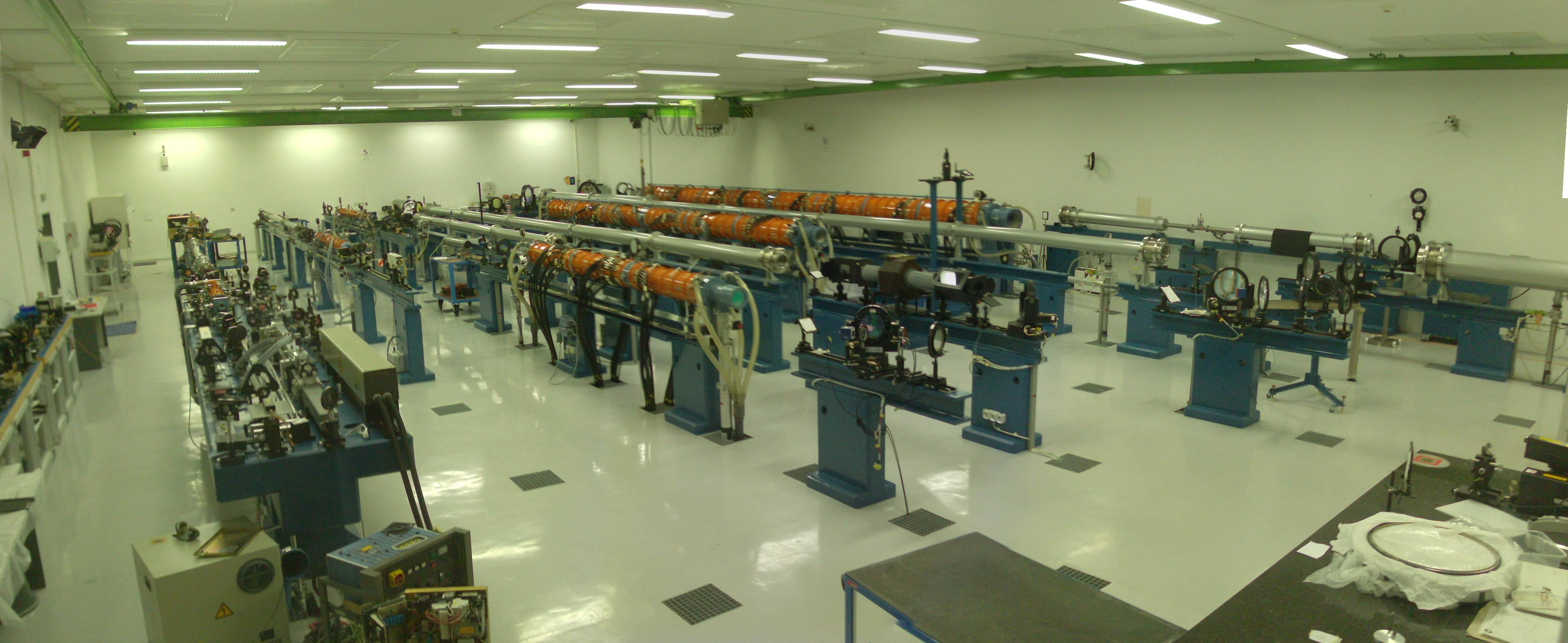
View of the master oscillator and 5 amplifier stages

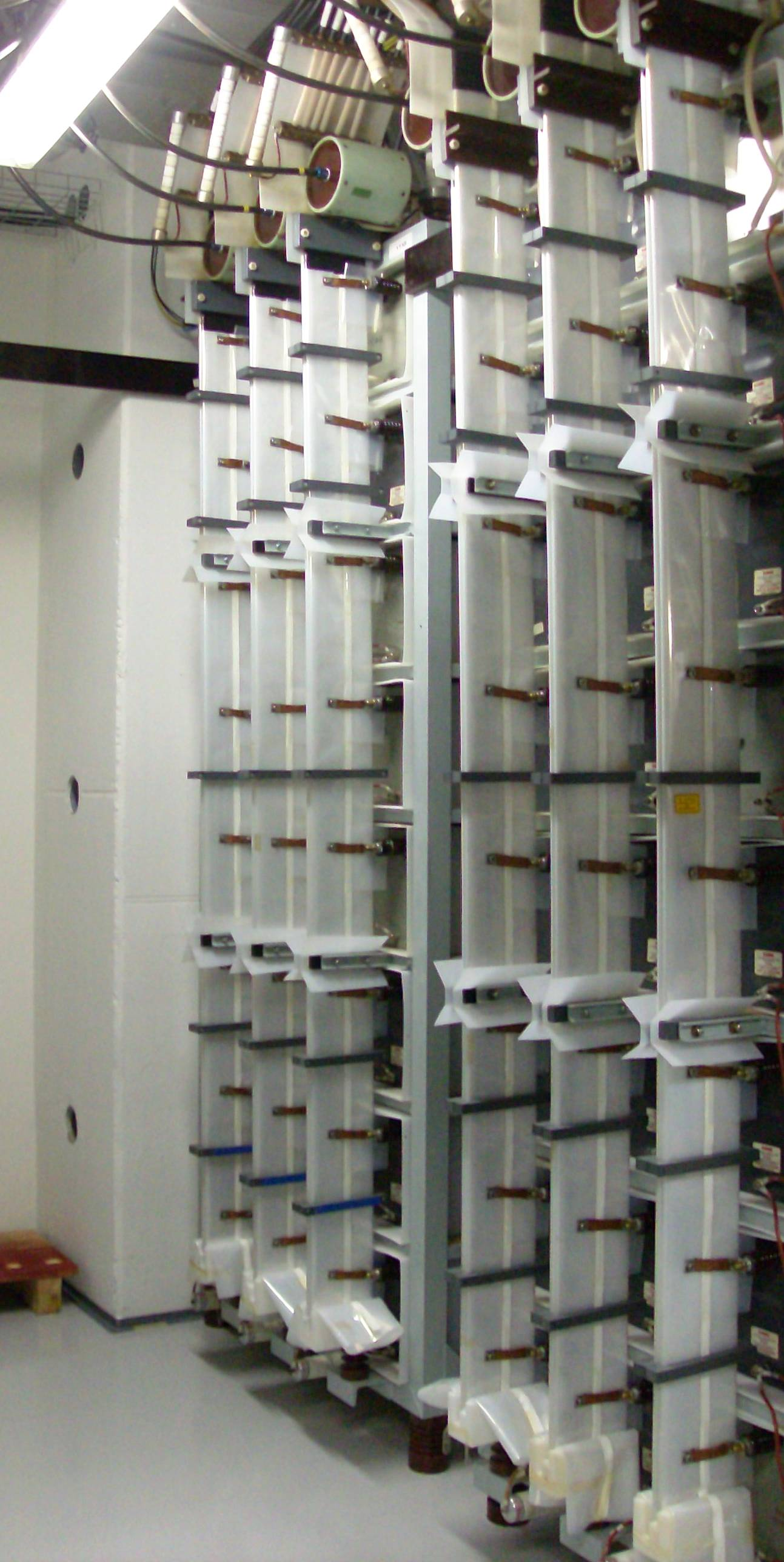
Part of capacitor bank

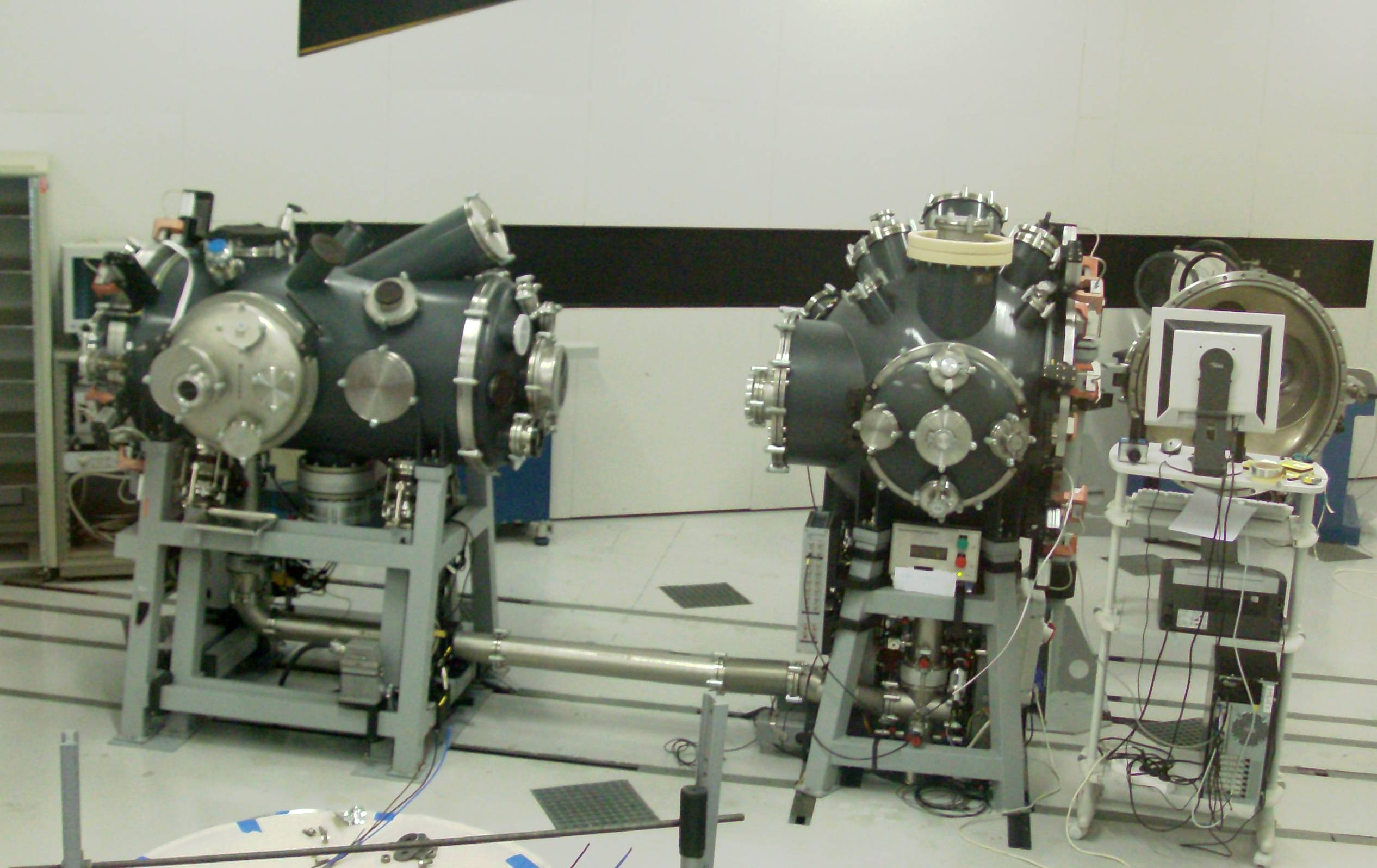
Interaction chambers

== See also ==
- Laser
- List of laser types
