= AILU =

Association of Industrial Laser Users
- Abbreviation: AILU
- Formation: November 1995
- Founded at: Abingdon, Oxfordshire, UK
- Type: Non-profit Organisation
- Location: 100 Ock Street, Abingdon, UK
- Members: 300+
- Key people: President: Ric Allott Vice-presidents: Paola De Bono, Richard Carter Exec. Director: Dave MacLellan

The Association of Industrial Laser Users (AILU) was established in 1995 as an independent, non-profit organisation run by and for laser users involved in activities including manufacturing, healthcare, academic and industrial research; as well as suppliers of laser-related products and services.

The association promotes many activities surrounding laser use, such as the fostering of co-operation and collaboration and the dissemination of information, experience and expertise relating to industrial laser technology, laser materials processing; its applications and related technologies.

== Organisation ==
The organisation of AILU is under the direction of an elected standing committee made up of representatives from the UK industrial laser community. Elections are held annually at the Annual General Meeting.

AILU provides a wide range of general services to laser users and suppliers and hosts a number of special interest groups (SIGs) to better support members who have particular interests in common. These include a Job Shop SIG (established in 1995, with 86 members) for subcontract laser-based engineering companies; a Market Development SIG (established in 2005, with 240 members) for suppliers of laser-related products and services; a Medical SIG (established in 2007, with 55 members) for clinicians, manufacturers using lasers for manufacture of medical devices and suppliers of laser-related products and services; and the Micro:Nano SIG, AILU's newest, launched in mid 2008 at AILU's 10th microprocessing workshop.”

== Activities ==
The current activities of AILU include:

- The AILU magazine - a quarterly magazine
- Workshops of topics of laser technology and applications.
- A Product and Services Directory
- Forums.
- Consultancy services.
- Surveys

== AILU’s Membership ==
Application for membership of AILU is open to the industrial laser community worldwide. AILU currently has over 300 members, which make up (by sector) manufacturing industry including laser job shops (40%), suppliers of laser-related products and services (30%) and research and consultancy organisations (25%).

== The AILU Award ==
The AILU award recognises those individuals who have made an outstanding contribution to the industrial use of lasers in the UK. The AILU Award is presented to an individual for significant contribution to laser materials processing and that preferably has wider benefit for the industrial laser user community.

Year	Recipient(s)	Outline
2015	Paul Hilton	Outstanding contribution to the industrial use of lasers in the UK
2013	John Bishop	Outstanding contribution to the industrial use of lasers in the UK
2011	Janet Stoyel	Contribution to the application of lasers to the discipline of Textiles, Art, Media and Design
2009	Brooke Ward	Pioneering work on measurement standards and optics, outstanding contribution to the industrial use of CO_{2} lasers in the UK.
2008	Tim Weedon	Pioneering efforts to introduce Nd:YAG-based machining systems into the UK.
2007	Malcolm Gower & Phil Rumsby	In recognition of their pioneering work with Excimer laser processing.
2006	David Stroud	For his outstanding contribution to the industrial use of lasers in the UK.
2005	Bill Steen	AILU's first President.
2004	Denis Hall	Innovator of industrial lasers and their applications.
2003	Colin Webb	Entrepreneur and gas laser innovator.
2001	David Dyson	Innovator in slow axial flow industrial laser design.
2000	Martin Adams, Derek Russell & Frank van Rompuy	Developers of the first fast axial flow CO_{2} laser .
1999	Maurice Gates	Entrepreneur and pioneer of lasers for fine metal cutting.
1998	Jim Wright	Entrepreneur and pioneer of industrial Nd:YAG laser applications.
1997	Peter Houldcroft	Inventor of oxygen assisted laser cutting.
