= Mor Katzir =

Israeli model (born 1980)

- מור קציר
- Born: August 23, 1980 (age 44); Haifa, Israel
- Height: 5 ft 9 in (1.75 m)

Mor Katzir (Hebrew: מור קציר; born August 23, 1980) is an Israeli model.

== Modeling career ==
Mor Katzir has posed for ads for Cole Haan, Ann Taylor, Costume National, and Missoni, and in catalogs for Saks, JCrew, H&M, and Nordstrom. Her most notable editorial work includes the covers of L'Officiel, Elle (France), and D (Italy). She has also appeared in V, The Face, Another, and German Vogue. Katzir has walked the runway for fashion houses including Bottega Veneta, Burberry, Givenchy, and Rick Owens

Katzir has been represented by agencies including 1 Model Mgmt NYC, Women Management Milan, and Women Management Paris. She is currently represented by Silent Models in Paris.

Her hobbies include feng shui and Chinese art.
