= Atomic spacing =

Distance between two nucleus

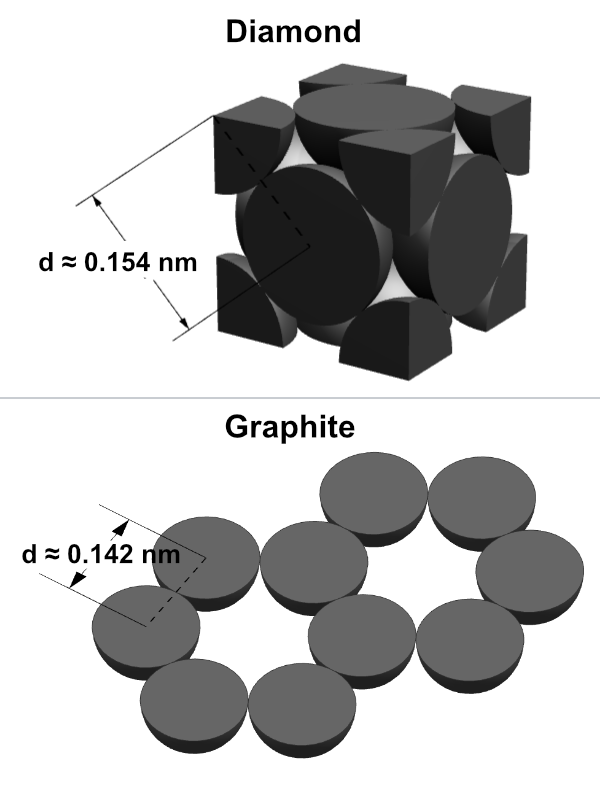
(Top) Diamond crystal structure, depicting an atomic spacing of 0.154 nm. (Bottom) Graphite crystal structure, depicting an atomic spacing of 0.142 nm.

Atomic spacing refers to the distance between the nuclei of atoms in a material. This space is extremely large compared to the size of the atomic nucleus, and is related to the chemical bonds which bind atoms together. In solid materials, the atomic spacing is described by the bond lengths of its atoms. In ordered solids, the atomic spacing between two bonded atoms is generally around a few ångströms (Å), which is on the order of 10^{−10} meters (see Lattice constant). However, in very low density gases (for example, in outer space) the average distance between atoms can be as large as a meter. In this case, the atomic spacing is not referring to bond length.

The atomic spacing of crystalline structures is usually determined by passing an electromagnetic wave of known frequency through the material, and using the laws of diffraction to determine its atomic spacing. The atomic spacing of amorphous materials (such as glass) varies substantially between different pairs of atoms, therefore diffraction cannot be used to accurately determine atomic spacing. In this case, the average bond length is a common way of expressing the distance between its atoms.

== Example ==
Bond length can be determined between different elements in molecules by using the atomic radii of the atoms. Carbon bonds with itself to form two covalent network solids. Diamond's C-C bond has a distance of $\frac{\sqrt{3}a}{4} \approx 0.154\ \text{nm}$ away from each carbon since $a_{\text{diamond}} \approx 0.357\ \text{nm}$, while graphite's C-C bond has a distance of $\frac{a}{\sqrt{3}} \approx 0.142\ \text{nm}$ away from each carbon since $a_{\text{graphite}} \approx 0.246\ \text{nm}$. Although both bonds are between the same pair of elements they can have different bond lengths.
