= Anders Flodström =

Swedish physicist (born 1944)

Sven Anders Flodström (born 1 October 1944) is a Swedish professor of materials physics at the Royal Institute of Technology.

Flodström was born in Söderhamn, Sweden. He studied engineering physics and electrical engineering in Linköping. In 1975, he was awarded a Ph.D. in physics in Linköping with the thesis "Electronic structure of clean and oxygen covered aluminium and magnesium surfaces studied by photoelectron spectroscopy". Flodström was also one of the initiators of the synchrotron facility MAX-Lab in Lund, where he served as a coordinator until 1985. In 1985 he was appointed professor of materials physics at the Royal Institute of Technology in Stockholm.

He was previously the rector of Linköping University from 1996 to 1999 and of the Royal Institute of Technology from 1999 to 2007 and University Chancellor of Sweden and head of the Swedish National Agency for Higher Education from 1 August 2007 to 30 June 2010.
