= Antiquarian science books =

Original historical works on science and technology

Antiquarian science books are original historical works (e.g., books or technical papers) concerning science, mathematics and sometimes engineering. These books are important primary references for the study of the history of science and technology, they can provide valuable insights into the historical development of the various fields of scientific inquiry (History of science, History of mathematics, etc.)

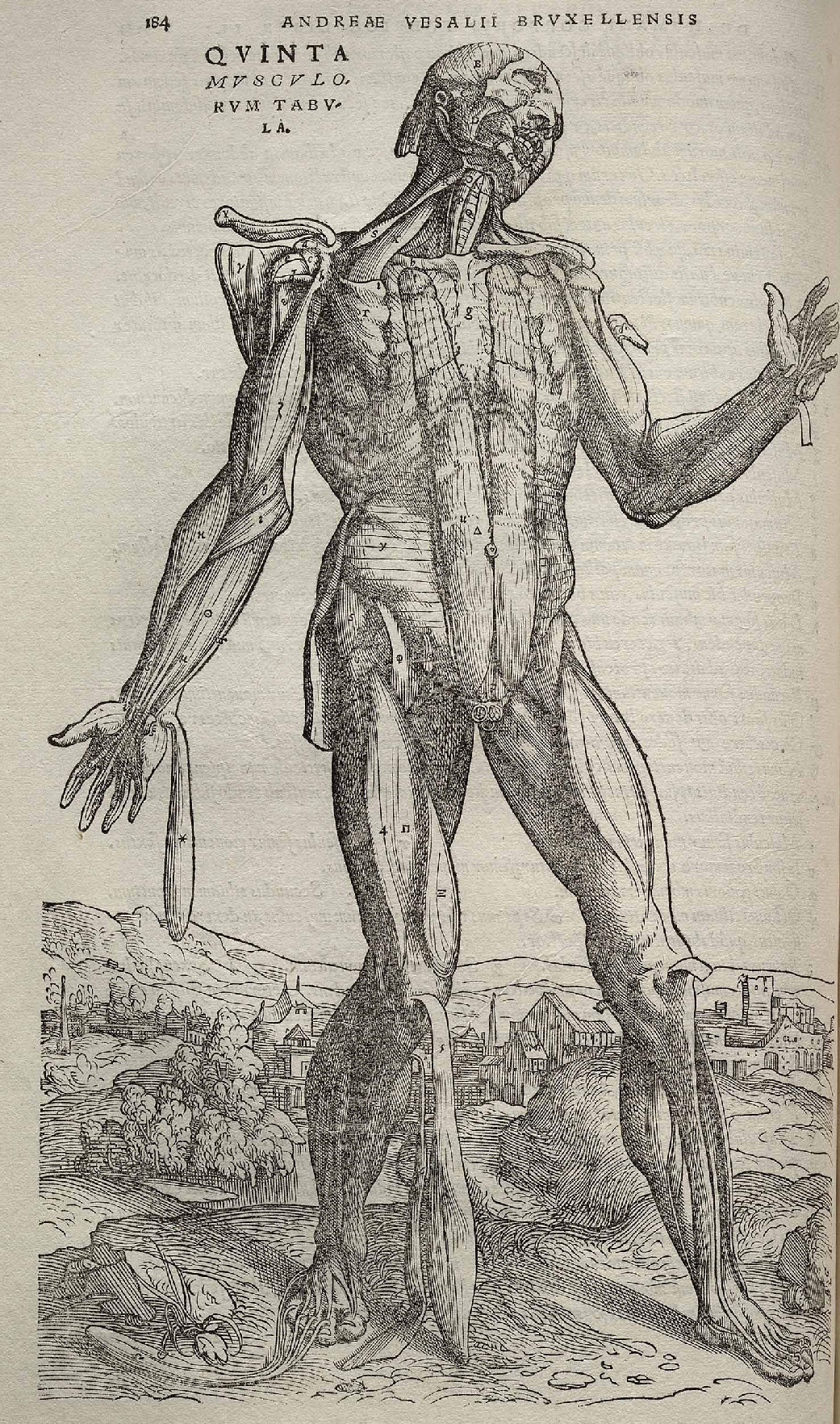
Vesalius, Fabrica, 16th century

The landmark are significant first (or early) editions typically worth hundreds or thousands of dollars (prices may vary widely based on condition, etc.). Reprints of these books are often available, for example from Great Books of the Western World, Dover Publications or Google Books.

Incunabula are extremely rare and valuable, but as the Scientific Revolution is only taken to have started around the 1540s, such works of Renaissance literature (including alchemy, Renaissance magic, etc.) are not usually included under the notion of "scientific" literature. Printed originals of the beginning Scientific Revolution thus date to the 1540s or later, notably beginning with the original publication of Copernican heliocentrism. Nicolaus Copernicus' De revolutionibus orbium coelestium of 1543 sold for more than US$2 million at auctions.

== List of notable books ==
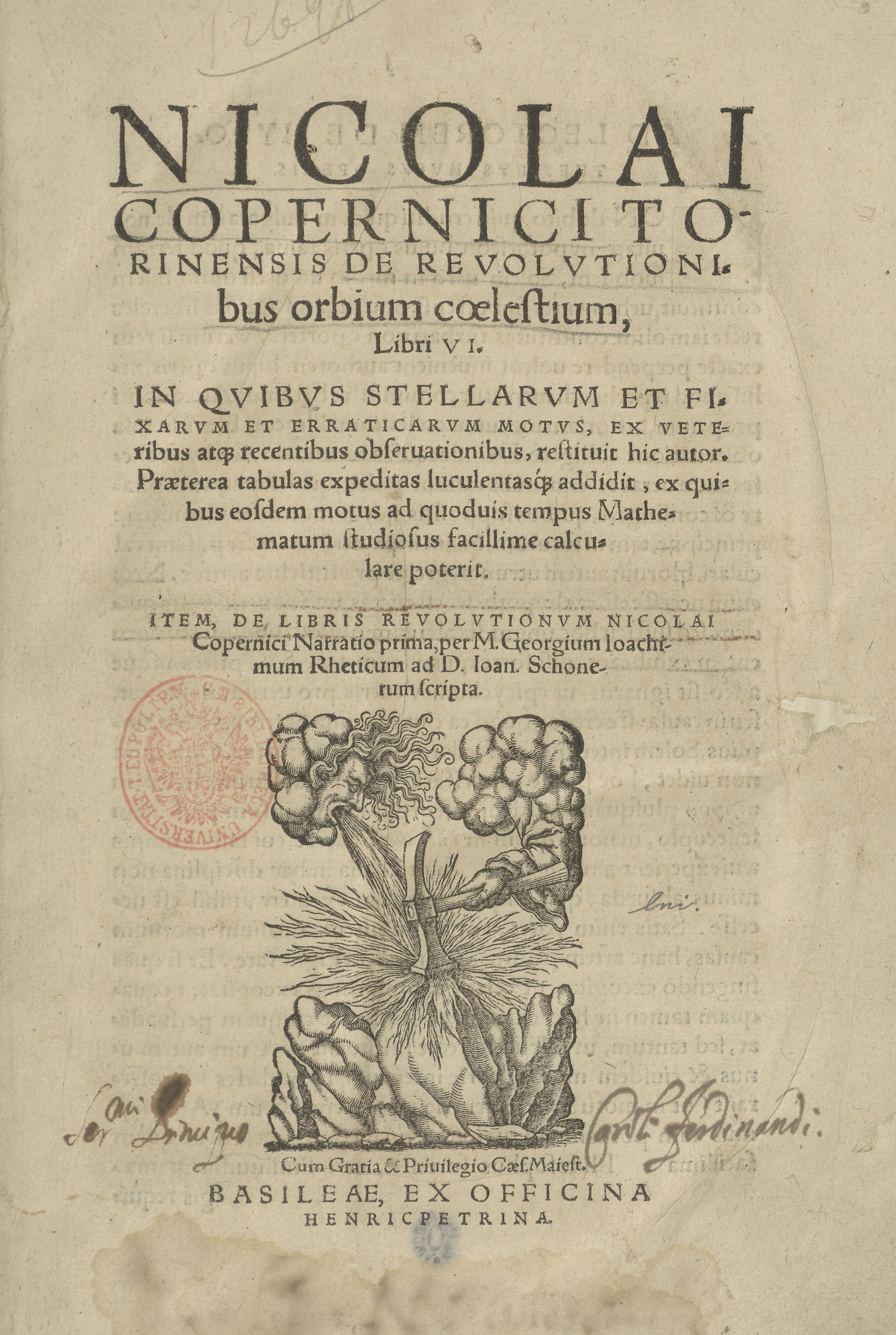
Copernicus, De revolutionibus, 1500s

=== 16th century ===
- Tartaglia, Niccolò. Nova Scientia (A New Science). Venice, 1537. Ballistics.
- Biringuccio, Vannoccio. De la pirotechnia. Venice, 1540. Metallurgy.
- Fuchs, Leonhart. De Historia Stirpium Commentarii Insignes. Basel, 1542. Botany.
- Copernicus, Nicolaus. De revolutionibus orbium coelestium. Wittenberg, 1543. Copernican heliocentrism.
- Vesalius, Andreas. De humani corporis fabrica (On the Structure of the Human Body). Basel, 1543. Anatomy.
- Cardano, Gerolamo. Artis magnae sive de regulis algebraicis (The Art of Solving Algebraic Equations). Nuremberg, 1545. Algebra.
- Brunfels, Otto. Kreuterbüch, 1546. Botany.
- Gessner, Conrad. Historia Animalium 1551-58. Zoology
- Bock, Hieronymus. Kreutterbuch. Strasbourg, 1552. Botany.
- Paracelsus. Theil der grossen Wundartzney. Frankfurt, 1556. Medicine.
- Agricola, Georgius. De re metallica. Basel, 1561. Mineralogy.
- Regiomontanus. De triangulis planis et sphaericis libri quinque. Basel, 1561. Trigonometry.
- Bombelli, Rafael. Algebra. 1569/1572. Imaginary numbers.
- Cesalpino, Andrea. De plantis libri XVI. 1583. Taxonomy.
- Bruno, Giordano. De l'infinito, universo e mondi. 1584 Cosmology.
- Stevin, Simon. De Thiende. 1585. Decimal numeral system.
- Stevin, Simon. De Beghinselen der Weeghconst. 1586. Statics.
- Brahe, Tycho. Astronomiae Instauratae Progymnasmata. 1588. Astronomy.
- Viète, François. In artem analyticum isagoge (Introduction to the Analytical Art). Tours, 1591. Algebra.
- Ruini, Carlo. Anatomia del Cavallo. Venice, 1598. Veterinary medicine.

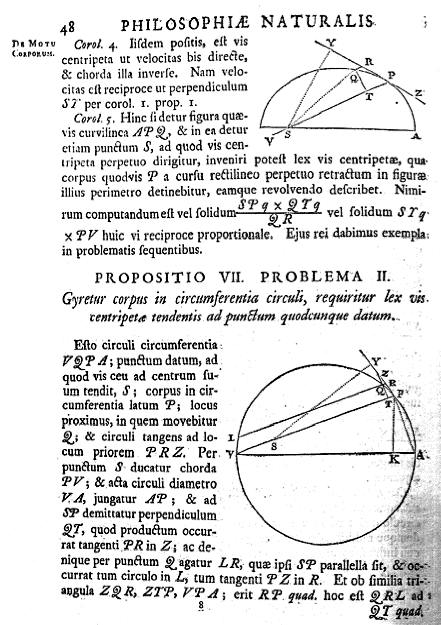
Newton, Principia, 1600s

=== 17th century ===
- Gilbert, William. De Magnete. London, 1600 Magnetism
- Galilei, Galileo. Sidereus Nuncius (The Starry Messenger). Frankfurt, 1610. Astronomy
- Napier, John. Mirifici Logarithmorum Canonis Descriptio, 1614. Logarithms
- Kepler, Johannes. Harmonices Mundi. Linz, 1619. Celestial mechanics
- Bacon, Francis. Novum Organum. London, 1620. Experimentation
- Galilei, Galileo. Dialogo sopra i due massimi sistemi del mondo Tolemaico, e Coperniciano. Florence, 1632. Heliocentrism
- Descartes, René. Discours de la Methode / La Geometrie. Leiden, 1637 Analytical geometry
- Fermat, Pierre de. Methodus ad disquirendam maximam et minimam, 1638. Calculus
- Galilei, Galileo. Discorsi e dimostrazioni matematiche, intorno a due nuove scienze. Leiden, 1638. Classical dynamics
- Desargues, Gérard. Brouillon-project d'une atteinte aux evenemens des rencontres du cone avec un plan, 1639. Projective geometry.
- Harvey, William. Exercitatio Anatomica de Motu Cordis et Sanguinis in Animalibus (Anatomical Exercises, Concerning the Heart and Blood) London, 1653. Circulatory system
- Wallis, John. Arithmetica infinitorum, 1655. Calculus
- Boyle, Robert. The Sceptical Chymist. London, 1661. Chemistry
- Pascal, Blaise. Traitez de l'Equilibre des Liqueurs, et de la Pesanteur de la Masse de l'Air. Paris, 1663. Fluid statics
- Gregory, James. Optica Promota, 1663. Optics
- Hooke, Robert. Micrographia. London, 1665. Microscopy
- Steno, Nicolas. De Solido intra Solidum Naturaliter Contento Dissertationis Prodromus. Florence, 1669. Stratigraphy
- Barrow, Isaac. Lectiones geometricae, 1670. Calculus
- von Guericke, Otto. Experimenta Nova (ut vocantur) Magdeburgica de Vacuo Spatio. Magdeburger Halbkugeln, 1672. Experimental physics
- Huygens, Christiaan. Horologium Oscillatorium. Paris, 1673. Pendulus.
- Fermat, Pierre de. Ad locus planos et solidos isagoge, 1679. Analytic geometry
- Leibniz, Gottfried. Nova Methodus pro Maximis et Minimis, 1684. Calculus
- Newton, Isaac. Philosophiæ Naturalis Principia Mathematica. London, 3 Vol, 1687. Classical mechanics
- Huygens, Christiaan. Traité de la Lumière. Leiden, 1690. Optics
- Leibniz, Gottfried Wilhelm. Specimen Dynamicum. Vienna, 1695. Classical mechanics
- van Leeuwenhoek, Antonie. Arcana Naturae, Ope & Beneficio Exquisitissimorum Microscopiorum. Leiden, 1696. Microbiology
- l'Hôpital, Guillaume de. Analyse des infiniment petits. Paris, 1696. Calculus

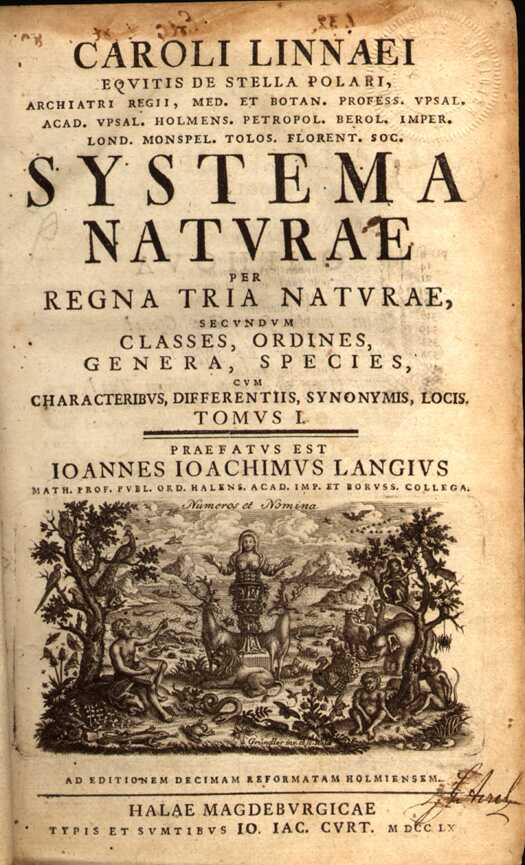
Linnaeus, Systema Naturae, 1700s

=== 18th century ===
- Newton, Isaac (England). Opticks. London, 1704. Optics
- Taylor, Brook (England). Methodus Incrementorum Directa et Inversa, 1715. Taylor series
- Linnaeus, Carl (Sweden). Systema Naturae. Netherlands, 1735. Linnaean taxonomy
- Bernoulli, Daniel (Netherlands). Hydrodynamica. Strasbourg, 1738, Fluid dynamics
- d'Alembert, Jean le Rond (France). Réflexions sur la cause générale des vents, 1747. Complex numbers
- Euler, Leonhard (Switzerland). Introductio in analysin infinitorum. Lausanne, 1748. Mathematical analysis
- Franklin, Benjamin (America). Experiments and Observations on Electricity. London/Philadelphia, 1751. Electricity
- Bayes, Thomas (England). An Essay Towards Solving a Problem in the Doctrine of Chances. London, 1763. Inverse probability
- Volta, Alessandro (Italy). De vi attractiva ignis electrici, ac phaenomenis inde pendentibus, 1769. Electricity
- Smith, Adam (Scotland). An Inquiry into the Nature and Causes of the Wealth of Nations. London, 2 Vol, 1776. Capitalism
- Monge, Gaspard (France). Sur la théorie des déblais et des remblais, 1781. Descriptive geometry.
- Lagrange, Joseph (Italy). Mécanique analytique. Paris, 1788. Dynamics
- Hutton, James (Scotland). Theory of the Earth. Edinburgh, 1788. Geology
- Lavoisier, Antoine (France). Traité Élémentaire de Chimie (Elements of Chemistry). Paris, 2 Vol, 1789. Chemistry
- Galvani, Luigi (Italy). De viribus electricitatis in motu musculari commentarius Bologna, 1791. Electricity
- Legendre, Adrien-Marie (France). Essai sur la théorie des nombres. Paris, 1798. Number theory
- Jenner, Edward (England). An Inquiry into the Causes and Effects of the Variolæ Vaccinæ. 1798. Immunology
- Wessel, Caspar (Norway). Om directionens analytiske betegning. Copenhagen, 1799. Imaginary numbers
- Ruffini, Paolo (Italy). Teoria generale dele equazioni, in cui si dimostra impossibile. La soluzione algebraica delle equazioni generali di grado superiore al quatro. Bologna, 1799. Algebra

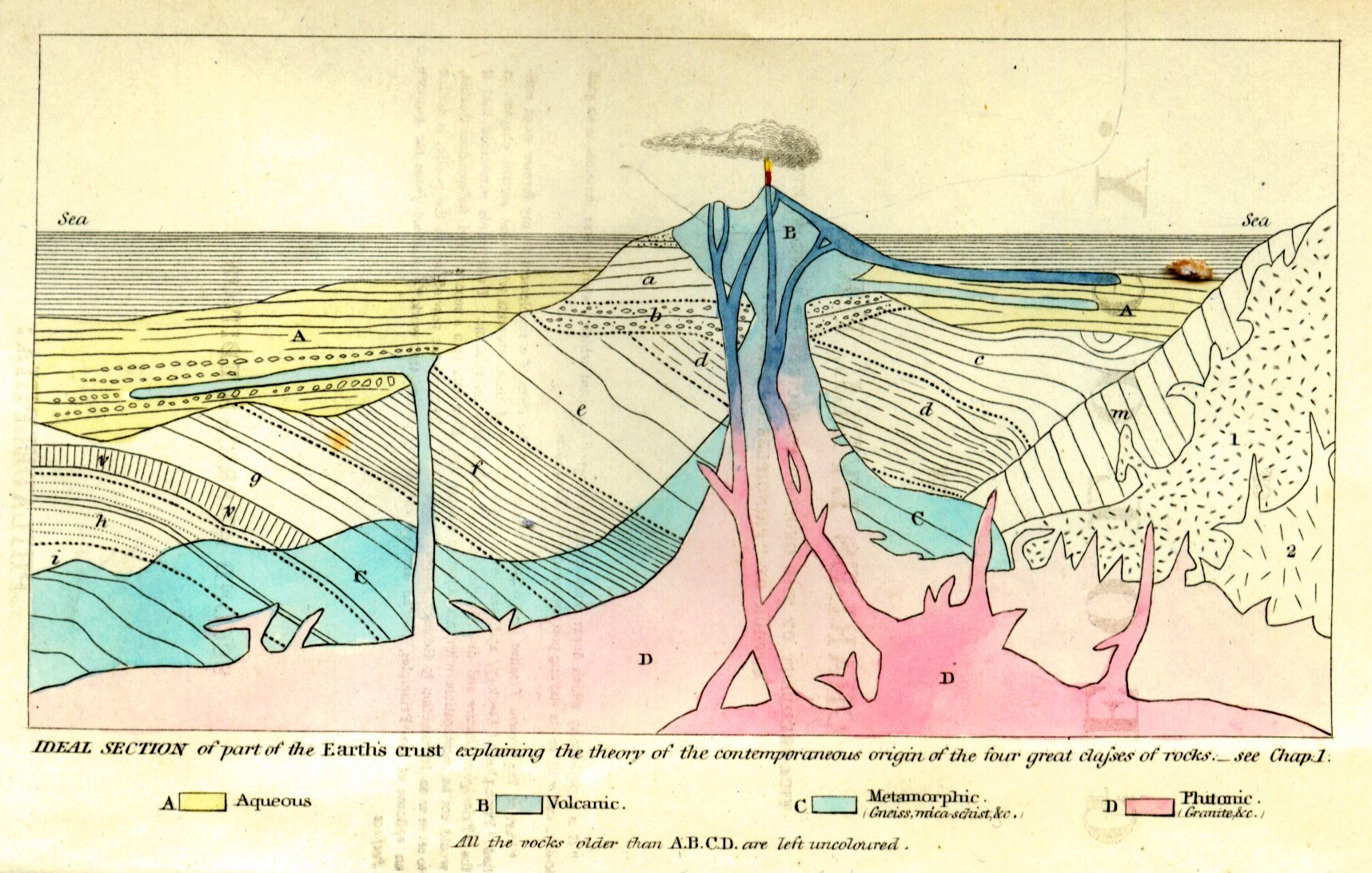
Lyell, Principles of Geology, 1800s

=== 19th century ===
- Gauss, Carl Friedrich (Germany). Disquisitiones Arithmeticae. Leipzig, 1801. Number theory
- Young, Thomas (England). Experiments and Calculations Relative to Physical Optics, 1803. Light
- Argand, Jean-Robert (Switzerland). Essai sur une maniere de representer les quantities imaginaries dans les constructions geometriques, 1806. Imaginary numbers.
- Dalton, John (England). A New System of Chemical Philosophy. London, 1808. Atomic theory
- Berzelius, Jöns Jacob (Sweden). Läroboken i kemien, 1808. Chemistry
- Cayley, George (England). On Aerial Navigation. Brompton, 3 Vol, 1809. Aeronautics.
- Ørsted, Hans Christian (Denmark). Experimenta circa effectum conflictus electrici in acum magneticam. Copenhagen, 1820. Electromagnetism.
- Fourier, Joseph (France). Théorie Analytique de la Chaleur. Paris, 1822. Fourier series.
- Fresnel, Augustin-Jean (France). Mémoire Sur Un Nouveau Système D'Éclairage Des Phares Lu À L'Académie Des Sciences. Paris, 1822. Wave optics
- Babbage, Charles (England). Mr. Babbage's invention: Application of machinery to the purpose of calculating and printing mathematical tables. London, 1823. Computing
- Lobachevsky, Nikolai (Russia). Geometriya. 1823. Non-Euclidean geometry
- Cauchy, Augustin-Louis (France). Le calcul infinitesimal. Paris, 1823. Mathematical analysis
- Carnot, Sadi (France). Réflexions sur la Puissance Motrice du Feu et sur les machines propres à déveloper cette puissance. Paris, 1824. Thermodynamics
- Ampère, André-Marie (France). Mémoire sur la théorie mathématique des phénomènes électrodynamiques, 1827. Electromagnetism
- Laplace, Pierre-Simon (France). Traité de Mécanique Céleste. Paris, 1827. Classical mechanics
- Ohm, Georg (Germany). Die Galvanische Kette mathematisch bearbeitet. Berlin, 1827. Electricity
- Lyell, Charles (Scotland). Principles of Geology. London, 1830. Geology
- Poisson, Siméon Denis (France). Théorie Mathématique de la Chaleur. Paris, 1835. Heat transfer
- Faraday, Michael (England). Experimental Researches in Electricity. London, 1839-55. Electricity.
- Babbage, Charles & Lovelace, Ada (England). Sketch of the Analytical Engine invented by Charles Babbage (with additional notes by Augusta Ada, Countess of Lovelace), 1843. Computing
- Joule, James P. (England). On the Calorific Effects of Magneto-Electricity, and on the Mechanical Value of Heat. London, 1843. Conservation of energy
- Hamilton, William Rowan (Ireland). On Quaternions. London/Edinburgh/Dublin, 1844. Quaternions.
- von Helmholtz, Hermann (Germany). Über die Erhaltung der Kraft (On the Conservation of Force). 1847. Conservation of energy
- Clausius, Rudolf (Germany). Ueber die bewegende Kraft der Wärme (On the Moving Force of Heat and the Laws of Heat which may be Deduced Therefrom). Leipzig, 1850. Laws of thermodynamics
- Thomson, William (1st Baron Kelvin) (Scotland/Ireland). On the dynamical theory of heat, with numerical results deduced from Mr Joule's equivalent of a thermal unit and M. Regnault's observations on steam. Edinburgh, 1851. Thermodynamics
- Boole, George (England). An Investigation of the Laws of Thought. London, 1854. Boolean algebra
- Maury, Matthew Fontaine (America). The Physical Geography of the Sea. New York, 1855. Oceanography
- Virchow, Rudolf (Germany). Die Cellularpathologie in ihrer Begründung auf physiologische und pathologische Gewebelehre. 1858. Cellular pathology
- Darwin, Charles (England). On the Origin of Species by Means of Natural Selection. London, 1859. Evolutionary biology
- Pasteur, Louis (France). Memoire sur les corpuscules organises qui existent dans l'atmosphere. Paris, 1861. Microbiology.
- Lejeune Dirichlet, P. G. (Germany). Vorlesungen über Zahlentheorie. Braunschweig, 1863, Number theory.
- Bernard, Claude (France). Introduction à l'étude de la médecine expérimentale. Paris, 1865. Physiology
- Mendel, Gregor (Czech Republic/Austria). Versuche über Pflanzen-Hybriden (Experiments on Plant Hybridization). Brno, 1866. Genetics
- Riemann, Bernhard (Germany). Ueber die Hypothesen, welche der Geometrie zu Grunde liegen. Göttingen, 1868. Riemannian geometry
- Beltrami, Eugenio (Italy). Saggio di interpretazione della geometria non-euclidea (Essay on an interpretation of non-Euclidean geometry), 1868. Hyperbolic geometry
- Galton, Francis (England). Hereditary Genius: An Inquiry into Its Laws and Consequences. London, 1869, Statistics
- Cohn, Ferdinand (Poland). Untersuchungen ueber Bacterien. Breslau, 3 Vol, 1870. Bacteriology.
- Darwin, Charles (England). The Descent of Man, and Selection in Relation to Sex. London, 1871. Evolutionary biology.
- Marx, Karl (Germany). Das Kapital. St. Petersburg, 1872. Economics.
- Maxwell, James Clerk (Scotland). A Treatise on Electricity and Magnetism. Oxford, 2 Vol, 1873. Classical electromagnetism.
- Koch, Robert (Germany). Untersuchungen uber die aetiologie der wundinfectionskrankheiter. Leipzig, 1878. Bacteriology.
- Gibbs, Willard (America). On the Equilibrium of Heterogeneous Substances. New Haven, 1878. Physical chemistry
- Michelson, Albert A. (America). Experimental Determination of the Velocity of Light. Annapolis, 1880. Speed of light.
- Abel, Niels Henrik (Norway). Oeuvres complètes, 1881. Mathematical analysis.
- Zhukovsky, Nikolai (Russia). O protchnosti dvizheniya (The Durability of Motion). Moscow, 1882. Aeronautics.
- Cantor, Georg (Russia/Germany). Grundlagen einer allgemeinen Mannigfaltigkeitslehre. Leipzig, 1883. Set theory.
- James, William (America). The Principles of Psychology. New York, 1890. Psychology
- Mendeleev, Dmitri (Russia). Principles of Chemistry. London, 1891. Chemistry
- Newcomb, Simon (America). Astronomical Papers Prepared for the Use of the American Ephemeris and Nautical Almanac. Washington, D.C., 1891. Astronomy
- Poincare, Henri (France). Les méthodes nouvelles de la mécanique céleste. Paris, 1892. Celestial mechanics
- Tesla, Nikola (Croatia/America). Experiments with Alternate Currents of High Potential and High Frequency. New York, 1892. Electricity
- Hertz, Heinrich (Germany). Untersuchungen über die Ausbreitung der elektrischen Kraft (Electric Waves). 1893. Electromagnetic radiation
- Röntgen, Wilhelm (Germany). Ueber eine neue Art von Strahlen (On A New Kind Of Rays). 1895. X-rays
- Bolyai, János (Hungary). The Science of Absolute Space. 1896. Non-Euclidean geometry
- Galois, Évariste (France). Oeuvres Mathematiques d'Évariste Galois. Paris, 1897. Group theory
- Curie, Marie (Poland/France) & Curie, Pierre (France). Sur une nouvelle substance fortement radio-active, contenue dans la pechblende (Comptes Rendus Hebdomadaires des Séances de l'Académie des Sciences). Paris, 1898. Radioactivity
- Hilbert, David (Germany). Grundlagen der Geometrie (The Foundations of Geometry). 1899. Mathematics
- Ramón y Cajal, Santiago (Spain). Textura del sistema nervioso del hombre y los vertebrados 1899-1904. Neuroscience

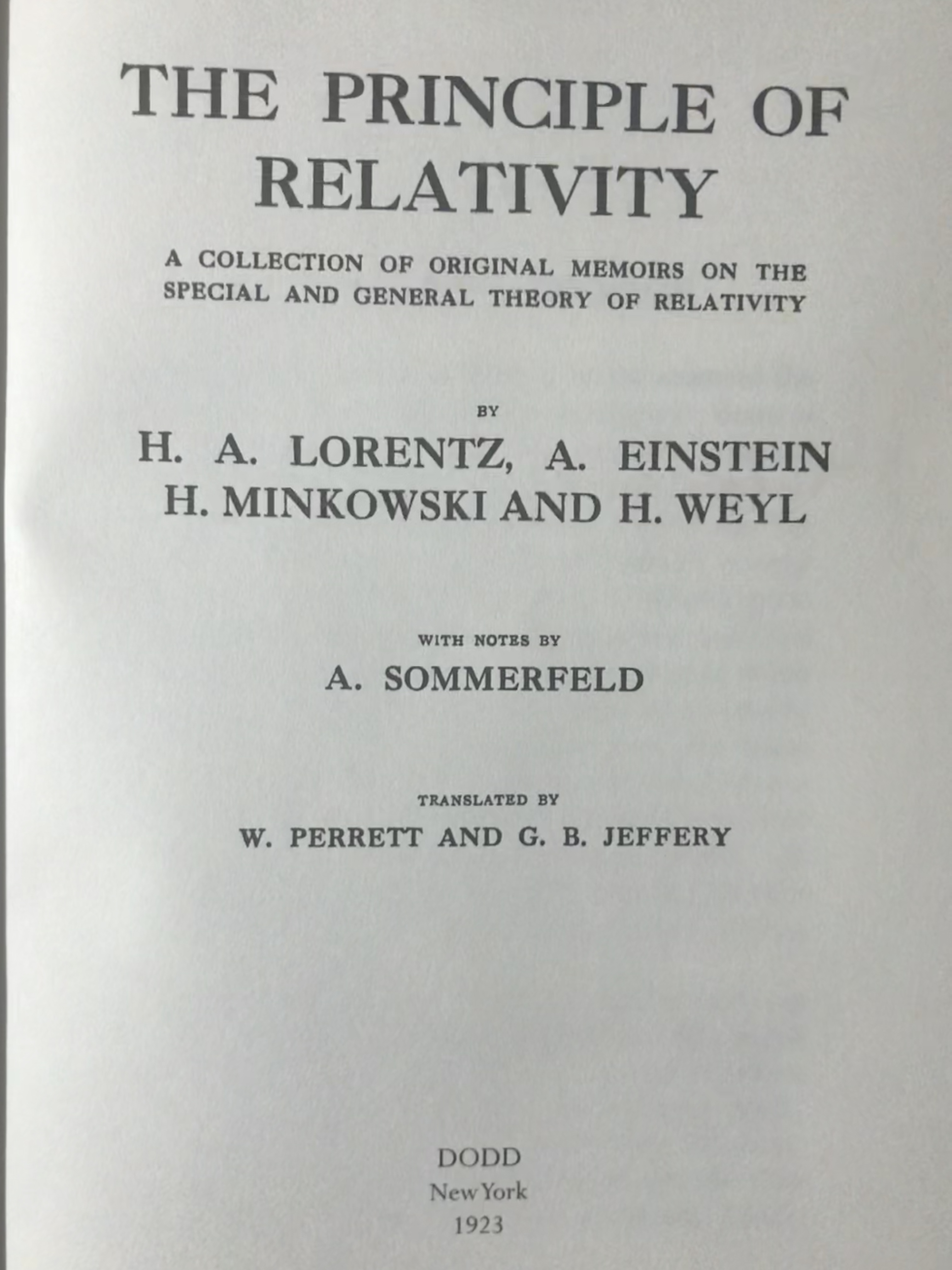
Einstein, The Principle of Relativity, 1900s

=== 20th century (pre-Cold War) ===
- Planck, Max (Germany). Zur Theorie des Gesetzes der Energieverteilung im Normalspectrum. Leipzig, 1900. Quantum mechanics
- Tsiolkovsky, Konstantin Eduardovich (Russia). The Exploration of Cosmic Space by Means of Reaction Devices. Kaluga, 1903. Rockets
- Rutherford, Ernest (New Zealand). Radio-activity. Cambridge, 1904. Nuclear physics
- Lorentz, Hendrik (Netherlands). Electromagnetic phenomena in a system moving with any velocity smaller than that of light. Amsterdam, 1904. Special relativity
- Einstein, Albert (Germany). Zur Elektrodynamik bewegter Körper ("On the Electrodynamics of Moving Bodies") Leipzig, 1905. Special relativity
- Einstein, Albert (Germany). Does the Inertia of a Body Depend Upon Its Energy Content? Leipzig, 1905. Physics
- Richardson, Lewis (England). The Approximate Arithmetical Solution by Finite Differences of Physical Problems Involving Differential Equations, with an Application to the Stresses in a Masonry Dam. London, 1910. Computational mechanics
- Boas, Franz (Germany/America). The Mind of Primitive Man. New York, 1911. Anthropology
- Bohr, Niels (Denmark). On the Constitution of Atoms and Molecules. London, 1913. Quantum mechanics
- Einstein, Albert (Germany). Die Grundlage Der Allgemeinen Relativitätstheorie (Foundations of the General Theory of Relativity). Leipzig, 1916. Physics.
- Goddard, Robert Hutchings (America). A Method of Reaching Extreme Altitudes. Washington, D.C, 1919. Rockets
- de Broglie, Louis (France). Recherches sur la théorie des quanta (Research on Quantum Theory), 1924. Wave–particle duality
- Whitehead, Alfred North (England) and Russell, Bertrand (England). Principia Mathematica. Cambridge, 1925. Mathematics
- Heisenberg, Werner (Germany). Über quantentheorestische Umdeutung kinematischer und mechanischer Beziehungen. Berlin, 1925. Quantum mechanics
- Schrödinger, Erwin (Austria). Quantisierung als Eigenwertproblem. Leipzig, 1926. Quantum mechanics
- Heisenberg, Werner (Germany). Über den anschaulichen Inhalt der quantentheoretischen Kinematik und Mechanik Berlin, 1927. Quantum mechanics
- Pavlov, Ivan (Russia). Conditioned Reflexes. New York, 1928. Classical conditioning
- Oberth, Hermann (Romania). Wege zur Raumschiffahrt (Ways to Spaceflight). Munich/Berlin, 1929. Rockets
- Hubble, Edwin (America). A Relation between Distance and Radial Velocity among Extra-Galactic Nebulae. Washington, D.C., 1929. Astrophysics
- Dirac, Paul (England). The Principles of Quantum Mechanics. Oxford, 1930. Quantum mechanics.
- Gödel, Kurt (Czech Republic/America). On formally undecidable propositions of Principia Mathematica and related systems. Leipzig, 1931. Mathematical logic.
- von Neumann, John (Hungary/America). Mathematische Grundlagen der Quantenmechanik. 1932. Quantum mechanics
- Goddard, Robert Hutchings (America). Liquid Propellant Rocket Development. Washington, D.C., 1936. Rockets
- Keynes, John Maynard (England). The General Theory of Employment, Interest and Money. London, 1936. Economics
- Church, Alonzo (America). A Note on the Entscheidungsproblem. Ann Arbor, 1936. Computer science.
- Turing, Alan (England). On Computable Numbers, with an Application to the Entscheidungsproblem. Cambridge, 1937. Computing
- Dobzhansky, Theodosius (Ukraine/America). Genetics and the Origin of Species. 1937. Evolutionary biology
- Shannon, Claude E. (America). A Symbolic Analysis of Relay and Switching Circuits (Master's thesis, MIT). 1937. Computing
- Pauling, Linus (America). The Nature of the Chemical Bond. Ithaca, 1939. Chemistry.
- von Neumann, John (Hungary/America) & Morgenstern, Oskar (Germany/America). Theory of Games and Economic Behavior. Princeton, 1944. Game theory
