= Želmanovce =

- Municipality
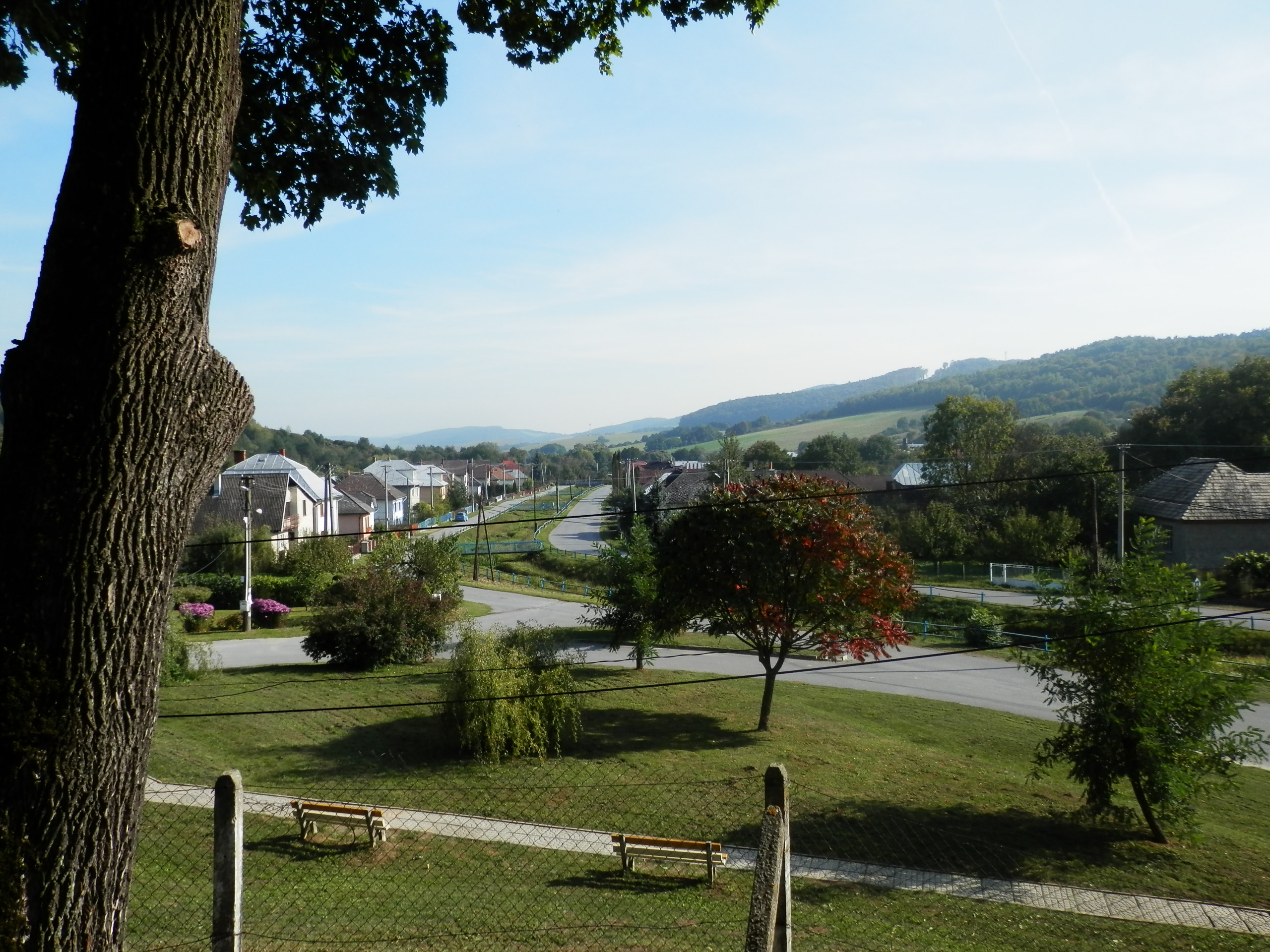

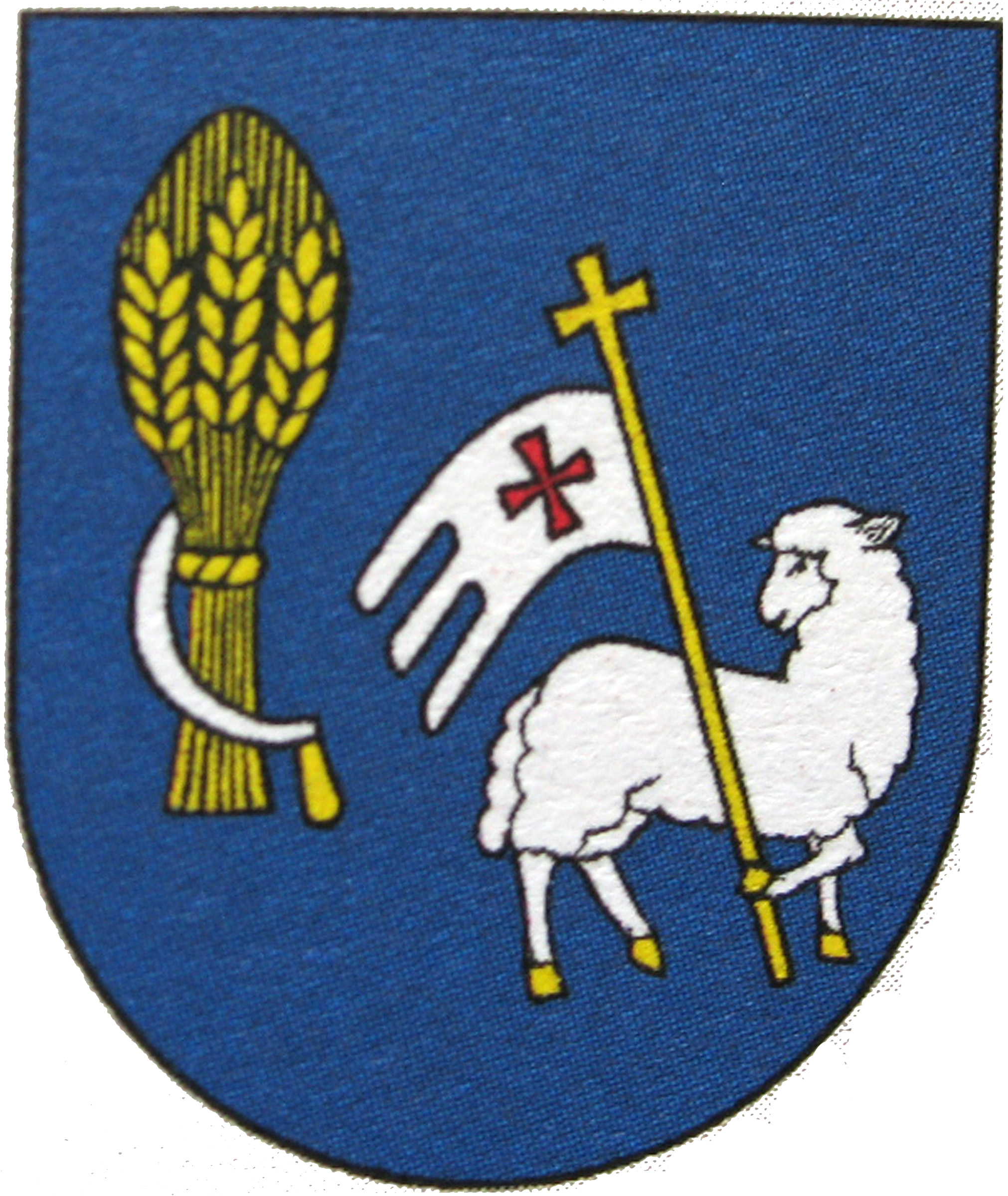
- Flag Coat of arms

- Location of Želmanovce in the Prešov Region Location of Želmanovce in Slovakia
- Coordinates: 49.12°N 21.42°E
- Country: Slovakia
- Region: Prešov Region
- District: Svidník District
- First mentioned: 1371

Area
  - Total: 4.70 km^{2} (1.81 sq mi)
- Elevation: 238 m (781 ft)

Population (2025)
  - Total: 317
- Time zone: UTC+1 (CET)
  - Summer (DST): UTC+2 (CEST)
- Postal code: 864 4
- Area code: +421 54
- Vehicle registration plate (until 2022): SK
- Website: www.zelmanovce.sk

For the mathematician, see Efim Zelmanov.

Želmanovce (Hungarian: Zsálmány) is a village and municipality in Svidník District in the Prešov Region of north-eastern Slovakia. It lies at an elevation of 238 metres (781 ft), and covers an area of 4.65 square kilometres (1.80 sq mi). Its population is about 340 people.

== Geography ==
The municipality lies at an altitude of 238 metres (781 ft) and covers an area of 4.70 km^{2} (1.81 sq mi) (2025).

== History ==
In historical records the village was first mentioned in 1371.

== Population ==
Population statistic (10 years)
Year	1995	2005	2015	2025
Count	307	345	333	317
Difference		+12.37%	−3.47%	−4.80%

Population statistic
Year	2024	2025
Count	308	317
Difference		+2.92%

It has a population of 317 people (31 December 2025).

=== Ethnicity ===
Census 2021 (1+ %)
Ethnicity	Number	Fraction
Slovak	322	98.47%
Not found out	4	1.22%
Total	327	

In year 2021 was 327 people by ethnicity 322 as Slovak, 4 as Not found out, 3 as Rusyn and 1 as Hungarian.

Note on population: The difference values of population numbers in the table "Population statistic" and in the sections "Ethnicity" & "Religion" is caused by the use of various statistical methods.

=== Religion ===
Census 2021 (1+ %)
Religion	Number	Fraction
Roman Catholic Church	306	93.58%
Greek Catholic Church	6	1.83%
None	6	1.83%
Not found out	4	1.22%
Total	327	

In year 2021 was 327 people by religion 306 from Roman Catholic Church, 6 from Greek Catholic Church, 6 from None, 4 from Not found out, 1 from Other and not ascertained christian church, 1 from Other, 1 from Evangelical Church, 1 from Czechoslovak Hussite Church and 1 from Ad hoc movements.
