= Alexander Kuzemsky =

Russian physicist

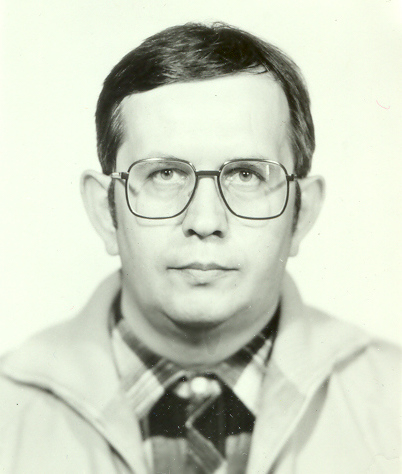
- Born: 1944 (age 81–82); Stalino, Ukrainian SSR, Soviet Union
- Education: Moscow State University
- Scientific career
- Fields: theoretical physics
- Workplaces: Joint Institute for Nuclear Research
- Doctoral advisor: Dmitry Zubarev

Alexander Leonidovich Kuzemsky (Russian: Александр Леонидович Куземский; born 1944) is a Russian (and former Soviet) theoretical physicist.

== Biography ==
Kuzemsky studied physics at the Faculty of Physics in Moscow State University (1963—1969). He received B.Sc. degree in 1969 (promotor professor L. A. Maksimov, correspondent member of Russian Academy of Sciences). Kuzemsky gained his Ph.D. in theoretical and mathematical physics in 1970 (promotor professor Dmitry Zubarev) and Doctor of Sciences degree in theoretical and mathematical physics in 1985. Both degrees were obtained from the Laboratory of Theoretical Physics, Joint Institute for Nuclear Research, Dubna where he is a staff member since 1969. He is currently a leading researcher at the Bogoliubov Laboratory of Theoretical Physics.

== Research ==
Kuzemsky worked on the variety of actual and notable topics of the statistical physics and condensed matter physics: nonequilibrium statistical mechanics quantum many-body theory quantum theory of magnetism theory of scattering of slow neutrons in magnets, superconductivity theory of magnetic semiconductors and notable theory of the magnetic polaron high-temperature superconductivity in layered compounds etc.

In series of his works the development of methods of quantum statistical mechanics was considered in light of their applications to quantum solid-state theory. He discussed fundamental problems of the physics of magnetic materials and the methods of the quantum theory of magnetism, including the method of two-time temperature Green's functions which is widely used in various physical problems of many-particle systems with interaction. Quantum cooperative effects and quasi-particle dynamics in the basic microscopic models of quantum theory of magnetism: the Heisenberg model, the Hubbard model, the Anderson Model, and the spin-fermion model were considered in the framework of novel self-consistent-field approximation. A comparative analysis of these models was presented; in particular, their applicability for description of complex magnetic materials was compared. Kuzemsky formulated notable Irreducible Green Functions Method (IGFM) for the systems with complex spectrum and strong interaction. The Green-function technique, termed the irreducible Green function method is a certain reformulation of the equation-of motion method for double-time temperature dependent Green functions. This advanced and notable method was developed to overcome some ambiguities in terminating the hierarchy of the equations of motion of double-time Green functions and to give a workable technique to systematic way of decoupling. The approach provides a practical method for description of the many-body quasi-particle dynamics of correlated systems on a lattice with complex spectra.

Moreover, this method provides a very compact and self-consistent way of taking into account the damping effects and finite lifetimes of quasi-particles due to inelastic collisions. In addition, it correctly defines the Generalized Mean Field (GMF), that determine elastic scattering renormalizations and, in general, are not functionals of the mean particle densities only. Applications to the lattice fermion models such as Hubbard/Anderson models and to the Heisenberg model of ferro- and antiferromagnet, which manifest the operational ability of the method were given. It was shown that the IGF method provides a powerful tool for the construction of essentially new dynamical solutions for strongly interacting many-particle systems with complex spectra. Kuzemsky derived a new self-consistent solution of the Hubbard model in the (1973–1978, a notable contribution to the theory of strongly correlated electron systems.

He also published a notable work on the quantum protectorate. Some physical implications involved in a new concept, termed the "quantum protectorate" (QP), invented by R. Laughlin and D. Pines were developed and discussed. This was done by considering the idea of quantum protectorate in the context of quantum theory of magnetism. It was suggested that the difficulties in the formulation of quantum theory of magnetism at the microscopic level, that are related to the choice of relevant models, can be understood better in the light of the QP concept. It was argued that the difficulties in the formulation of adequate microscopic models of electron and magnetic properties of materials are intimately related to dual, itinerant and localized behaviour of electrons. A criterion of what basic picture describes best this dual behaviour was formulated. The main suggestion was that quasi-particle excitation spectra might provide distinctive signatures and good criteria for the appropriate choice of the relevant model. The concepts of broken symmetry, quantum protectorate, and Bogoliubov's quasi-averages were analyzed in the context of quantum theory of magnetism and theory of superconductivity.

In this interdisciplinary study he focused on the applications of the symmetry principles to quantum and statistical physics in connection with some other branches of science. The idea of quasiaverages, formulated by N. N. Bogoliubov, gives the so-called macro-objectivation of the degeneracy in domain of quantum statistical mechanics, quantum field theory and in the quantum physics in general. He discussed there the complementary unifying ideas of modern physics, namely: spontaneous symmetry breaking, quantum protectorate and emergence.

The interrelation of the concepts of symmetry breaking, quasiaverages and quantum protectorate was analyzed in the context of quantum theory and statistical physics. The chief purposes of that study were to demonstrate the connection and interrelation of these conceptual advances of the many-body physics and to try to show explicitly that those concepts, though different in details, have a certain common features. Several problems in the field of statistical physics of complex materials and systems (e.g. the chirality of molecules) and the foundations of the microscopic theory of magnetism and superconductivity were discussed in relation to these ideas.

The notion of broken symmetry was presented also within the nonequilibrium statistical operator approach developed by D. N. Zubarev. The ensemble method, as it was formulated by J. W. Gibbs, has the generality and the broad applicability to equilibrium statistical mechanics. Different macroscopic environmental constraints lead to different types of ensembles, with particular statistical characteristics.

The nonequilibrium statistical operator method permits one to generalize the Gibbs ensemble method to the nonequilibrium case and to construct a nonequilibrium statistical operator which enables one to obtain the transport equations and calculate the transport coefficients in terms of correlation functions, and which, in the case of equilibrium, goes over to the Gibbs distribution. In the framework of the latter approach the derivation of kinetic equations for a system in a thermal bath was carried out. The problem about the appearance of a stochastic process in a dynamical system which is submitted to the influence of a "large" system was considered in notable paper, in the approach of the nonequilibrium statistical operator. The derivation of the equation which describes approximately the evolution of the state of the dynamic system interacting with the thermal bath was given. The Equation derived can be called a Schroedinger-type equation with damping for a dynamical system in a thermal bath. The results of investigation of the dynamic behavior of a particle in an environment, taking into account dissipative effects, were considered and applied to a variety of concrete problems.

He formulated also a successive and notable statistical theory of spin relaxation and diffusion in solids based on the approach of the non-equilibrium statistical operator of Dmitry Zubarev.

A. L. Kuzemsky is author of more than 210 scientific publications, including 20 review articles and 2 monographs. Among them there are the extensive review devoted to the works of D. I. Blokhintsev on quantum mechanics and solid state physics and review devoted to the methods of statistical mechanics developed by N. N. Bogoliubov

His recent publications were devoted to study of various actual problems of condensed matter physics, statistical mechanics, theory of transport processes, many-body physics and quantum theory of magnetism. These results are described in the fundamental monograph

== Publications ==
He has authored more than 210 publications on statistical physics, many-body physics, condensed matter theory, quantum theory of magnetism and other topics.

- List of publications of A. L. Kuzemsky
