= Alessandro Vaciago =

- Born: September 11, 1931; Piacenza, Italy
- Died: November 17, 1993 (aged 62); Washington, D.C., U.S.
- Known for: crystallography
- Scientific career
- Fields: chemistry physics

Alessandro Vaciagoa, a diplomat and crystallographer. born in Piacenza 11 September 1931. was a Professor of Chemical Structure, University of Rome from 1971 to 1993. He also served as a Cultural Counselor for the Italian Embassy in 1981-1990.

The Accademia dei Lincei awards yearly the Vaciago Prize to distinguished researchers in different fields of science.

== List of recipients of the Vaciago Prize ==
- 2005: Paolo Mario de Gregorio, Physics.
- 2006: Federico Russo, History.
- 2007: Giuseppina Terzo, Mathematics.
- 2008: Francesco Mercuri, Chemistry.
