= Arvind Rajaraman =

Indian theoretical physicist and string theorist

Arvind Rajaraman is an Indian-born theoretical physicist and string theorist. Rajaraman earned his Ph.D. from Stanford University. He is an associate professor at University of California, Irvine.

The first time that India received any medals in International Mathematics Olympiad (IMO) was in 1989, when four among six Indian participants received a bronze medal. Rajaraman was one of these four bronze medal-winning participants. Rajaraman was also part of the UC Irvine team whose research contributed to the 2003 Nobel Prize in Physics.
