= Axilrod–Teller potential =

Three-body potential in molecular physics

In molecular physics, the Axilrod–Teller potential (also known as the Axilrod–Teller–Muto or ATM potential) describes the interaction potential (energy) between three atoms, capturing effects beyond simple pairwise attractions. It builds on the London dispersion forces, using perturbation theory to correct for the influence of a third atom. Its strength depends on properties of the atoms and their arrangement in space. This potential is often used in models of rare gases and molecular dynamics simulations to study complex attraction effects.

== Formula ==
The ATM potential is given by:

$$V_{ijk}= E_{0} \left[
\frac{1 + 3 \cos\gamma_{i} \cos\gamma_{j} \cos\gamma_{k}}{\left( r_{ij} r_{jk} r_{ik} \right)^3}
\right]$$

where $r_{ij}$ is the distance between atoms $i$ and $j$, and $\gamma_{i}$ is the angle between the vectors $\mathbf{r}_{ij}$ and $\mathbf{r}_{ik}$. The coefficient $E_{0}$ is positive and of the order $V\alpha^{3}$, where $V$ is the ionization energy and $\alpha$ is the mean atomic polarizability; the exact value of $E_{0}$ depends on the magnitudes of the dipole matrix elements and on the energies of the $p$ orbitals.
