= ATRAP experiment =

Collaboration at the Antiproton Decelerator

The Antihydrogen Trap (ATRAP) collaboration at the Antiproton Decelerator facility at CERN, Geneva, was responsible for the AD-2 experiment. It was a continuation of the TRAP collaboration, which started taking data for the TRAP experiment (also known as the PS196 experiment) in 1985. The TRAP experiment pioneered cold antiprotons, cold positrons, and first made the ingredients of cold antihydrogen to interact. Later ATRAP members pioneered accurate hydrogen spectroscopy and observed the first hot antihydrogen atoms.

== Experimental setup ==
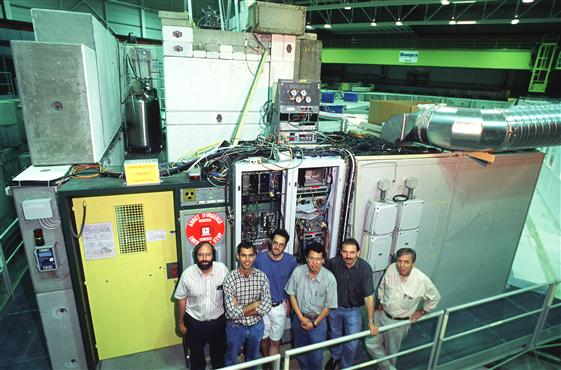
ATRAP collaborators next to the apparatus that first trapped, cooled and stacked antiprotons at CERN's AD

ATRAP was a collaboration between physicists around the world with the goal of creating and experimenting with antihydrogen. ATRAP accumulates positrons emitted from a radioactive ^{22}Na source. There are two effective ways to slow down the fast positrons by inelastic processes. The ATRAP collaboration initially chose a different method to ATHENA (AD-1).

=== Slowing down and trapping positron ===
The positrons which were emitted by the ^{22}Na were first slowed down with a 10 μm thick titanium foil and then passed through a 2 μm thick tungsten crystal. Within the crystal there is a possibility that a positively charged positron and a negatively charged electron form a Rydberg positronium atom. In this process, the positrons lose much of their energy so that it is no longer necessary (as in ATHENA) to decelerate further with collisions in gas. When the loosely bound Rydberg positronium atom reaches the Penning trap at the end of the apparatus, it is ionized and the positron is caught in the trap.

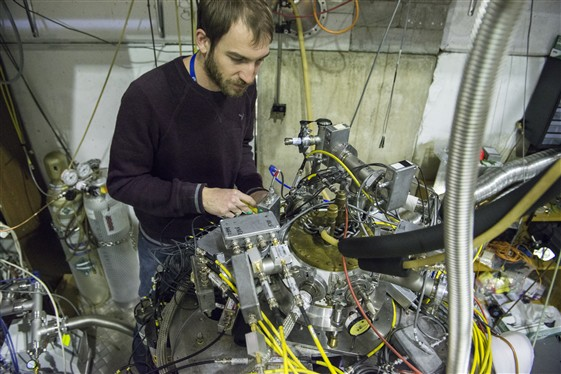
A post-doctoral fellow on the ATRAP experiment, with the Penning trap apparatus for trapping antiprotons.

Since this method of positron accumulation was not particularly efficient, ATRAP switched to a Surko-type buffer gas accumulator as is now standard in experiments requiring large numbers of positrons. This has led to the storage of the largest ever number of positrons in an Ioffe trap.

ATRAP has been terminated. ATRAP had an Ioffe trap, which attempted to store the electrically neutral antihydrogen using a magnetic quadrupole field. This was potentially possible because the magnetic moment of antihydrogen is non-zero. Laser spectroscopy was intended to be performed on antihydrogen stored in the Ioffe trap, however no publication was ever made.

== ATRAP collaboration ==
The ATRAP collaboration comprised the following institutions:

- Harvard University, US
- York University, Canada
- University of Mainz, Germany
- Forschungszentrum Jülich, Germany
