= Abraham Katzir =

Israeli academic and physicist

- אברהם קציר
- Katzir in 2010
- Born: 1941 (age 84–85); Jerusalem
- Alma mater: Hebrew University of Jerusalem (PhD, 1974)
- Known for: Silver halide infrared optical fibers
- Relatives: Aharon Katzir (father); Ephraim Katzir (uncle)
- Scientific career
- Fields: Physics, biomedical optics, fiber optics
- Workplaces: Tel Aviv University; Caltech

Abraham Katzir (Hebrew: אברהם קציר; born 1941 in Jerusalem, Israel) is a Professor of Physics at Tel Aviv University, holding the Carol and Mel Taub Chair in Applied Medical Physics. He is the son of Professor Aharon Katzir, also a scientist, who was killed in 1972 in Ben-Gurion Airport by Japanese terrorists. His uncle, Professor Ephraim Katzir, was the President of Israel.

Katzir studied physics and mathematics at the Hebrew University of Jerusalem, receiving a BSc in 1964 and an MSc in 1966. He worked as a research physicist in the Israel Defense Forces (1965–1969) and at the Soreq Nuclear Research Center (1969–1974). He received his PhD from the Hebrew University in 1974 and, with a Fulbright fellowship, joined Caltech in Pasadena, California, as a Senior Research Fellow. In 1977 he established the Applied Physics Group at Tel Aviv University, which he heads. In the past, Prof. Katzir worked in some of the top research laboratories in the US. He was a Visiting Member of Staff at AT&T Bell Laboratories in Summit, New Jersey, and he was a visiting professor at the Massachusetts Institute of Technology (MIT) in Cambridge, Massachusetts, and in Boston University, Boston, Massachusetts.

Katzir is an expert in the fields of biomedical optics and fiber optics. His group at Tel Aviv University developed special fibers made of crystalline silver halides, which are among the few that are highly transparent in the middle-infrared (mid-IR). He and members of the group have been involved with research and development of new methods and new systems, based on these fibers. They made significant contributions to the use of mid-IR fibers for scientific, medical, industrial and environmental protection applications.In the course of this work, Katzir collaborated with leading scientists in major national laboratories, universities, research institutions and industrial companies, all over the world.

Katzir supervised the research work of 100 students in MSc and PhD dissertations and their research was published in 400 scientific papers. He also published the book "Lasers and Optical Fibers in Medicine".

Katzir is the Chair of ILEOS, the Israel Lasers and Electro Optics Society, and the Chair of the bi-annual OASIS (Optical Applied Science in Israel) international conferences that this society organizes in Israel. He has been a member of the board of governors of SPIE, the International Society for Optics and Photonics, serving as a director of SPIE from 1991 to 1994. He was elected a Fellow of SPIE in 1989 and a Fellow of the Optical Society of America in 1994. He has organized and chaired tens of international symposia and conferences in the fields of biomedical optics, optical fibers, and electro-optics.

Tel Aviv University holds an annual series of free public lectures in Hebrew, Bekur HaMahapecha ("In the Crucible of Revolution"), in memory of his father; speakers have included leading Israeli scientists and scholars, and Katzir himself has lectured in the series.
