= Abraham Zelmanov =

Soviet physicist (1913–1987)

Abraham Zelmanov (May 15, 1913 – February 2, 1987) was a Soviet scientist working in the General Theory of Relativity and cosmology. He first constructed, in 1944, the complete mathematical method to calculate physical observable quantities in the General Theory of Relativity (the theory of chronometric invariants). Applying the mathematical apparatus, in the 1940s, he established the basics of the theory of inhomogeneous anisotropic universe, where he determined specific kinds of all cosmological models—scenarios of evolution—which could be theoretically conceivable for a truly inhomogeneous and anisotropic Universe in the framework of Einstein's theory.

== Life ==
Abraham Leonidovich Zelmanov was born on May 15, 1913, in Poltava Gubernya of the Russian Empire. His father was a Judaic religious scientist, a specialist in comments on Torah and Kabbalah. In 1937, Zelmanov completed his education at the Mechanical Mathematical Department of Moscow University. After 1937, he was a research-student at the Sternberg Astronomical Institute in Moscow, where he presented his dissertation in 1944. In 1953, he was arrested for "cosmopolitism" in Joseph Stalin's campaign against Jews. However, as soon as Stalin died, Zelmanov was set free, after some months of imprisonment. For several decades Zelmanov and his paralyzed parents lived in a room in a flat shared with neighbours. He took everyday care of his parents, so they lived into old age. In the 1970s, he obtained a personal municipal flat. He was married three times. Zelmanov worked on the academic staff of the Sternberg Astronomical Institute all his life, until his death on 2 February 1987.

== Scientific career ==
Zelmanov liked to remark that he preferred to make mathematical "instruments" than to use them in practice. Perhaps thereby his main goal in science was the mathematical apparatus of physical observable quantities in the General Theory of Relativity, completed in 1941–1944, and known as the theory of chronometric invariants. Many researchers were working on the theory of observable quantities in the 1940s. For example, Landau and Lifshitz, in their famous the Classical Theory of Fields first published in 1941, introduced observable time and the observable three-dimensional interval, similar to those introduced by Zelmanov. But they limited themselves to this particular case only. Only Zelmanov arrived at general mathematical methods to define physical observable quantities in pseudo-Riemannian spaces, and collected all the methods in complete theory. In developing the apparatus he also created other mathematical methods, namely — kinemetric invariants and monad formalism.

Solving Einstein's equations with his mathematical apparatus of chronometric invariants, Zelmanov obtained the total system of all cosmological models (scenarios of the Universe's evolution) which could be possible as derived from the equations. In particular, he had arrived at the possibility that infinitude may be relative. In the 1950s, he enunciated the Infinite Relativity Principle:

In homogeneous isotropic cosmological models spatial infinity of the Universe depends on our choice of that reference frame from which we observe the Universe (the observer's reference frame). If the three-dimensional space of the Universe, being observed in one reference frame, is infinite, it may be finite in another reference frame. The same is just as well true for the time during which the Universe evolves.

Most of his time was spent in scientific work, but he sometimes gave lectures on the General Theory of Relativity and relativistic cosmology as a science for the geometrical structure of the Universe. Because Zelmanov made scientific creation the main goal of his life, writing articles was a waste of time to him. However he never regretted time spent on long discussions in friendly company, where he set forth his philosophical concepts on the geometrical structure of the Universe and the process of human evolution. In those discussions he formulated his famous Anthropic Principle and the Infinite Relativity Principle.

His Anthropic Principle is stated in two versions. The first version sets forth the idea that the law of human evolution is dependent upon fundamental physical constants:

Humanity exists at the present time and we observe world constants completely because the constants bear their specific numerical values at this time. When the world constants bore other values humanity did not exist. When the constants change to other values humanity will disappear. That is, humanity can exist only with the specific scale of the numerical values of the cosmological constants. Humanity is only an episode in the life of the Universe. At the present time cosmological conditions are such that humanity develops.

In the second form he argues that any observer depends on the Universe he observes in the same way that the Universe depends on him:

The Universe has the interior we observe, because we observe the Universe in this way. It is impossible to divorce the Universe from the observer. The observable Universe depends on the observer and the observer depends on the Universe. If the contemporary physical conditions in the Universe change then the observer is changed. And vice versa, if the observer is changed then he will observe the world in another way, so the Universe he observes will also change. If no observers exist then the observable Universe as well does not exist.

In other words, using purely mathematical methods of the General Theory of Relativity, Zelmanov showed that any observer forms his world-picture from a comparison between his observational results and some standards he has in his laboratory — the standards of different objects and their physical properties. So the "world" we see as a result of our observations depends directly on that set of physical standards we have, so the "visible world" depends directly on our considerations about some objects and phenomena.

Being very demanding of himself, Zelmanov got less than a dozen short scientific publications during his life (see above References and also). So every publication is a concentrate of his fundamental scientific ideas. His main books Chronometric Invariants and Lectures on General Relativity were published posthumous.

Zelmanov believed that everything in our world is completely determined by the geometry of the basic space (space-time) that is, by Einstein, the meaning of the General Theory of Relativity. Zelmanov just stated that the human consciousness depends on the space geometry as well as the space geometry depends on the human consciousness. So Zelmanov paved new ways in Einstein's theory, getting the pure mathematics close to the human perception and experiment.

== Selected publications ==
This list may be incomplete.

- Zelmanov AL. Chronometric Invariants And Co-Moving Coordinates In The General Relativity Theory . Doklady Akademii Nauk SSSR 107 (6): 815-818 1956 . Times Cited: 81 .
- Zelmanov AL. Orthometric Form Of Monadic Formalism And Its Relation To Chronometric And Kinemetric Invariants . Doklady Akademii Nauk SSSR 227 (1): 78-81 1976 . Times Cited: 28 .
- Zelmanov AL. Kinemetric Invariants And Their Relation To Chronometric Invariants Of Einsteins Theory Of Gravity . Doklady Akademii Nauk SSSR 209 (4): 822-825 1973 . Times Cited: 20 .
- Zelmanov AL. On The Question As To The Infinite Extension Of Space In General Relativity . Doklady Akademii Nauk SSSR 124 (5): 1030-1033 1959 . Times Cited: 16 .
- Zelmanov AL. The Problem Of The Deformation Of The Co-Moving Space In Einsteins Theory Of Gravitation . Doklady Akademii Nauk SSSR 135 (6): 1367-1370 1960 . Times Cited: 6 .
- Zelmanov AL. Relativity Of Spatial And Temporal Finiteness And Infiniteness Of World Filled With Matter . Astronomicheskii Zhurnal 54 (6): 1168-1181 1977 . Times Cited: 5 .
- Zelmanov AL, Kharbedia Li. Necessary Conditions Of Relativity Of Finiteness And Infinity Of Non-Empty Space . Astronomicheskii Zhurnal 55 (1): 186-187 1978 . Times Cited: 4 .
- Zelmanov AL. Primenenie Soputstvuyushchikh Koordinat V Nerelyativistskoi Mekhanike . Doklady Akademii Nauk SSSR 61 (6): 993-996 1948 . Times Cited: 1 .
- Zelmanov AL, Khabibov Zr. Chronometrically Invariant Variations In The Einstein Theory Of Gravitation . Doklady Akademii Nauk SSSR 268 (6): 1378-1380 1983 . Times Cited: 0.
