= Atkinson friction factor =

Atkinson friction factor is a measure of the resistance to airflow of a duct. It is widely used in the mine ventilation industry but is rarely referred to outside of it.

Atkinson friction factor is represented by the symbol $k$ and has the same units as air density (kilograms per cubic metre in SI units, lbfmin^2/ft^4 in Imperial units). It is related to the more widespread Fanning friction factor by

$k = \frac{1}{2}\rho f,$

in which $\rho$ is the density of air in the shaft or roadway under consideration and $f$ is Fanning friction factor (dimensionless). It is related to the Darcy friction factor by

$k = \frac{1}{2}\rho \frac{\lambda}{4},$

in which $\lambda$ is the Darcy friction factor (dimensionless).

It was introduced by John J Atkinson in an early mathematical treatment of mine ventilation (1862) and has been known under his name ever since.

== See also ==
- Atkinson resistance
