= Amos Ori =

Amos Ori (Hebrew: עמוס אורי; born 1956) is a professor of Physics at the Technion – Israel Institute of Technology in Haifa, Israel. He received media attention in 2005 when he proposed, in a letter to Physical Review Letters, what he claimed was a more "realistic" model for time travel.

== See also ==
- Wormhole
