= Advanced Composite Materials (journal) =

- Discipline: Composite materials
- Language: English
- Edited by: T. Yokozeki, J.R. Lee, Il-K. Oh

Publication details
- History: 1991–present
- Publisher: Taylor & Francis
- Frequency: Bimonthly
- Impact factor: 2.870 (2020)

Standard abbreviations
- ISO 4: Adv. Compos. Mater.

Indexing
- ISSN: 0924-3046 (print); 1568-5519 (web)
- OCLC no.: 48768564

Links
- Journal homepage; Online access; Online archive

Advanced Composite Materials is a bimonthly peer-review scientific journal that was established in 1991. It is published by Taylor & Francis on behalf of the Japan Society for Composite Materials and the Korean Society for Composite Materials. The journal covers all scientific and technological aspects of composite materials and composite material structures, including physical, chemical, mechanical, and other properties of advanced composites as well as microscopic to macroscopic behavior studied both experimentally and theoretically. Novel fabrication techniques for composites and composite structural components are also included.

In addition to original research papers, the journal publishes technical papers, review papers, and research notes. News accounts related to new materials and their processing are also included. Furthermore, some papers originally published in Japanese in the Journal of the Japan Society for Composite Materials are translated and published in this journal.

== Abstracting and indexing ==
The journal is abstracted and indexed by:

- Ceramic Abstracts
- Chemical Abstracts
- Civil Engineering Abstracts
- Computer and Information Systems Abstracts
- Current Contents
- Earthquake Engineering Abstracts
- Engineering Index
- Inspec
- International Aerospace Abstracts
- Materials Science Citation Index
- Mechanical & Transportation Engineering Abstracts
- METADEX
- Science Citation Index
- Scopus
- Solid States and Superconductivity Abstracts
- Textile Technology Index
- World Aluminium Abstracts
- World Ceramics Abstracts

According to the Journal Citation Reports, the journal has a 2020 impact factor of 2.870.
