= List of United States MPEG-2 patents =

A large number of patents have been filed in the United States since 1978 for video coding systems and devices adhering to the MPEG-2 standard. All of these patents are now expired.

Patent	Filed	granted	First File	Expiry	Summary	Notes	Company
4833543	24 December 1986	23 May 1989	24 December 1986	24 December 2006	Image processing system and phase-locked loop used therein	U.S. patent 4,833,543 file+20: [2006, 12, 24] grant+17: [2006, 5, 23]	Alcatel-Lucent
4970590	21 December 1989	13 November 1990	21 December 1989	21 December 2009	System and device for package multiplexing in transmission of many data flows generated by a sole algorithm	U.S. patent 4,970,590 file+20: [2009, 12, 21] grant+17: [2007, 11, 13]	Alcatel-Lucent
5453790	26 March 1993	26 September 1995	26 March 1993	26 March 2013	Video decoder having asynchronous operation with respect to a video display	U.S. patent 5,453,790 file+20: [2013, 3, 26] grant+17: [2012, 9, 26]	Alcatel-Lucent
5136377	11 December 1990	4 August 1992	11 December 1990	11 December 2010	Adaptive non-linear quantizer	U.S. patent 5,136,377 file+20: [2010, 12, 11] grant+17: [2009, 8, 4]	AT&T Bell Laboratories
4383272	13 April 1981	10 May 1983	13 April 1981	13 April 2001	Video signal interpolation using motion estimation	U.S. patent 4,383,272 file+20: [2001, 4, 13] grant+17: [2000, 5, 10]	Bell Telephone Laboratories, Incorporated
5291284	23 July 1991	1 March 1994	12 December 1989	1 March 2011	Predictive coding and decoding with error drift reduction	U.S. patent 5,291,284 file+20: [2011, 7, 23] pct_file+20: [2009, 12, 12] grant+17: [2011, 3, 1]	British Telecommunications plc
4982270	3 February 1989	1 January 1991	3 February 1989	3 February 2009	Video data transmitting system	U.S. patent 4,982,270 file+20: [2009, 2, 3] grant+17: [2008, 1, 1]	Canon Inc.
5068724	15 June 1990	26 November 1991	15 June 1990	15 June 2010	Adaptive motion compensation for digital television	U.S. patent 5,068,724 file+20: [2010, 6, 15] grant+17: [2008, 11, 26]	CIF LICENSING, LLC
5091782	9 April 1990	25 February 1992	9 April 1990	9 April 2010	Apparatus and method for adaptively compressing successive blocks of digital video	U.S. patent 5,091,782 file+20: [2010, 4, 9] grant+17: [2009, 2, 25]	CIF LICENSING, LLC
5093720	20 August 1990	3 March 1992	20 August 1990	20 August 2010	Motion compensation for interlaced digital television signals	U.S. patent 5,093,720 file+20: [2010, 8, 20] grant+17: [2009, 3, 3]	CIF LICENSING, LLC
RE35093	3 December 1990	9 March 1993	3 December 1990	3 December 2010	Systems and methods for coding even fields of interlaced video sequences	Reissue of 05193004 filed 9 December 1994 granted 21 November 1995; U.S. patent RE35093 file+20: [2010, 12, 3] related_patent+20: [2010, 12, 32] grant+17: [2010, 3, 9] (Note: Case Text: This application is a continuation of application Ser. No. 08/218,970, filed on Mar. 25, 1994, now abandoned, and is a reissue of U.S. Pat. No. 5,193,004.)	Columbia University
4796087	1 June 1987	3 January 1989	1 June 1987	1 June 2007	Process for coding by transformation for the transmission of picture signals	U.S. patent 4,796,087 file+20: [2007, 6, 1] grant+17: [2006, 1, 3]	France Télécom
5235618	6 November 1990	10 August 1993	6 November 1990	6 November 2010	Video signal coding apparatus, coding method used in the video signal coding apparatus and video signal coding transmission system having the video signal coding apparatus	U.S. patent 5,235,618 file+20: [2010, 11, 6] grant+17: [2010, 8, 10]	Fujitsu
4706260	7 November 1986	10 November 1987	7 November 1986	7 November 2006	DPCM system with rate-of-fill control of buffer occupancy	U.S. patent 4,706,260 file+20: [2006, 11, 7] grant+17: [2004, 11, 10]	General Electric
4813056	8 December 1987	14 March 1989	8 December 1987	8 December 2007	Modified statistical coding of digital signals	U.S. patent 4,813,056 file+20: [2007, 12, 8] grant+17: [2006, 3, 14]	General Electric
4394774	26 June 1981	19 July 1983	15 December 1978	15 December 1998	Digital video compression system and methods utilizing scene adaptive coding with rate buffer feedback	U.S. patent 4,394,774 file+20: [2001, 6, 26] related_patent+20: [1998, 12, 15] Override: Referenced patent had its term changed grant+17: [2000, 7, 19] terminal disclaimer date December 15, 1998 (Note: Case Text: This is a continuation of application Ser. No. 969,991, filed Dec. 15, 1978, now U.S. Pat. No. 4,302,775.)	General Instrument
4698672	27 October 1986	6 October 1987	27 October 1986	27 October 2006	Coding system for reducing redundancy	U.S. patent 4,698,672 file+20: [2006, 10, 27] grant+17: [2004, 10, 6]	General Instrument
5426464	18 October 1994	20 June 1995	14 January 1993	14 January 2013	Field elimination apparatus for a video compression/decompression system	U.S. patent 5,426,464 file+20: [2014, 10, 18] related_patent+20: [2013, 1, 14] grant+17: [2012, 6, 20] (Note: Case Text: This is a divisional application of Ser. No. 08/004,753, filed 14 Jan. 1993.)	GE
5486864	13 May 1993	23 January 1996	13 May 1993	13 May 2013	Differential time code method and apparatus as for a compressed video signal	U.S. patent 5,486,864 file+20: [2013, 5, 13] grant+17: [2013, 1, 23]	GE
5491516	14 January 1993	13 February 1996	14 January 1993	13 February 2013	Field elimination apparatus for a video compression/decompression system	U.S. patent 5,491,516 file+20: [2013, 1, 14] grant+17: [2013, 2, 13]	GE
5600376	20 March 1995	4 February 1997	14 January 1993	4 February 2014	Field elimination apparatus for a video compression/decompression system	U.S. patent 5,600,376 file+20: [2015, 3, 20] related_patent+20: [2013, 1, 14] grant+17: [2014, 2, 4] (Note: Case Text: This is a divisional application Ser. No. 08/324,558, filed 18 Oct. 1994, now U.S. Pat. No. 5,426,464 which is a divisional of application Ser. No. 08/004,753 filed 14 Jan. 1993 now U.S. Pat. No. 5,491,516.)	GE
5796743	23 May 1996	18 August 1998	30 November 1993	18 August 2015	Data word indicator in a system for assembling transport data packets	U.S. patent 5,796,743 file+20: [2016, 5, 23] pct_file+20: [2013, 11, 30] grant+17: [2015, 8, 18]	GE
5867501	7 June 1995	2 February 1999	17 December 1992	2 February 2016	Encoding for communicating data and commands	U.S. patent 5,867,501 file+20: [2015, 6, 7] related_patent+20: [2012, 12, 17] grant+17: [2016, 2, 2] (Note: Case Text: This application is a continuation-in-part of application Ser. No. 07/992,944, filed Dec. 17, 1992 now abandoned. The disclosed invention is related to the commonly assigned, co-pending applications Ser. Nos. 08/485,217, 08/482,618, 08/474,772, 08/485,053, 08/473,541, 08/474,770 now U.S. Pat. No. 5,675,579, issued Oct. 7, 1997, 08/472,222 now abandoned in favor of Ser. No. 08/762,653, filed Dec. 9, 1996, 08/481,749 now U.S. Pat. No. 5,675,807, issued Oct. 7, 1997, 08/484,281, 08/482,628 now U.S. Pat. No. 5,574,849, issued Nov. 12, 1996, 08/479,473, 08/485,062, 08/485,446 now abandoned, and 08/485,055 filed concurrently herewith.)	Hewlett-Packard Company
4849812	24 February 1988	18 July 1989	24 February 1988	24 February 2008	Television system, in which digitized picture signals subjected to a transform coding are transmitted from an encoding station to a decoding station	U.S. patent 4,849,812 file+20: [2008, 2, 24] grant+17: [2006, 7, 18]	Koninklijke Philips Electronics N.V.
4901075	11 September 1987	13 February 1990	11 September 1987	11 September 2007	Method and apparatus for bit rate reduction	U.S. patent 4,901,075 file+20: [2007, 9, 11] grant+17: [2007, 2, 13]	Koninklijke Philips Electronics N.V.
5021879	24 September 1990	4 June 1991	25 April 1988	4 June 2008	System for transmitting video pictures	U.S. patent 5,021,879 file+20: [2010, 9, 24] related_patent+20: [2008, 4, 25] grant+17: [2008, 6, 4] (Note: Case Text: This is a continuation of application Ser. No. 442,475, filed Nov. 22, 1989 which is a continuation of Ser. No. 185,608 filed Apr. 25, 1988, now abandoned.)	Koninklijke Philips Electronics N.V.
5027206	13 September 1989	25 June 1991	13 September 1989	13 September 2009	High-definition television systems	U.S. patent 5,027,206 file+20: [2009, 9, 13] grant+17: [2008, 6, 25]	Koninklijke Philips Electronics N.V.
5128758	2 June 1989	7 July 1992	2 June 1989	7 July 2009	Method and apparatus for digitally processing a high definition television augmentation signal	U.S. patent 5,128,758 file+20: [2009, 6, 2] grant+17: [2009, 7, 7]	Koninklijke Philips Electronics N.V.
5179442	26 November 1990	12 January 1993	2 June 1989	12 January 2010	Method and apparatus for digitally processing a high definition television augmentation signal	U.S. patent 5,179,442 file+20: [2010, 11, 26] related_patent+20: [2009, 6, 2] grant+17: [2010, 1, 12] (Note: Case Text: This application is a continuation of U.S. application Ser. No. 361,523 filed Jun. 2, 1989, now U.S. Pat. No. 5,128,758. The contents of this application is specifically incorporated herein by reference.)	Koninklijke Philips Electronics N.V.
5333135	1 February 1993	26 July 1994	1 February 1993	1 February 2013	Identification of a data stream transmitted as a sequence of packets	U.S. patent 5,333,135 file+20: [2013, 2, 1] grant+17: [2011, 7, 26]	Koninklijke Philips Electronics N.V.
5606539	31 August 1994	25 February 1997	5 June 1991	25 February 2014	Method and apparatus for encoding and decoding an audio and/or video signal, and a record carrier for use with such apparatus	U.S. patent 5,606,539 file+20: [2014, 8, 31] related_patent+20: [2011, 6, 5] grant+17: [2014, 2, 25] (Note: Case Text: CROSS REFERENCE TO RELATED APPLICATIONS This is a continuation of Application Ser. No. 08/086,402, filed Jun. 30, 1993 and now abandoned, which was a continuation of Application Ser. No. 07/711,186, filed Jun. 5, 1991 and now abandoned.)	Koninklijke Philips Electronics N.V.
5608697	18 March 1996	4 March 1997	5 June 1991	5 June 2011	Record carrier containing an audio and/or video signal, which has been encoded and includes a decoder delay time parameter indicating a time delay for one or more portions of the signal	U.S. patent 5,608,697 file+20: [2016, 3, 18] related_patent+20: [2011, 6, 5] (Note: Case Text: CROSS REFERENCE TO RELATED APPLICATIONS This is a division of application Ser. No. 08/299,027, filed on Aug. 31, 1994, which is a continuation of application Ser. No. 08/086,402, filed Jun. 30, 1993 and now abandoned, which was a continuation of application Ser. No. 07/711,186, filed Jun. 5, 1991 and now abandoned.)	Koninklijke Philips Electronics N.V.
5699476	9 May 1996	16 December 1997	19 October 1990	19 October 2010	Method and apparatus for transmitting and/or storing a series of hierarchically encoded digital image data blocks	U.S. patent 5,699,476 file+20: [2016, 5, 9] related_patent+20: [2010, 10, 19] (Note: Case Text: This is a continuation of application Ser. No. 08/369,864, filed Jan. 5, 1995, abandoned, which was a continuation of application Ser. No. 08/111,037, filed Aug. 24, 1993, abandoned, which was a continuation of application Ser. No. 07/600,452, filed on Oct. 19, 1990, abandoned.)	Koninklijke Philips Electronics N.V.
5740310	28 June 1994	14 April 1998	30 May 1991	14 April 2015	Method of maintaining display continuity from a CD with slow-motion or freeze capability	U.S. patent 5,740,310 file+20: [2014, 6, 28] related_patent+20: [2011, 5, 30] grant+17: [2015, 4, 14] (Note: Case Text: This is a continuation of application Ser. No. 07/707,527, filed May 30, 1991, now abandoned.)	Koninklijke Philips Electronics N.V.
5844867	9 September 1996	1 December 1998	5 June 1991	5 June 2011	Methods and apparatus for encoding and decoding an audio and/or video signal, and a record carrier used therewith or produced therefrom	U.S. patent 5,844,867 file+20: [2016, 9, 9] related_patent+20: [2011, 6, 5] (Note: Case Text: CROSS REFERENCE TO RELATED APPLICATIONS This is a continuation of application Ser. No. 08/299,027, filed on Aug. 31, 1994, now U.S. Pat. No. 5,606,539, which is a continuation of application Ser. No. 08/086,402, filed Jun. 30, 1993 and now abandoned, which was a continuation of application Ser. No. 07/711,186, filed Jun. 5, 1991 and now abandoned.)	Koninklijke Philips Electronics N.V.
6181712	11 October 1995	30 January 2001	23 February 1995	30 January 2018	Method and device for transmitting data packets	U.S. patent 6,181,712 file+20: [2015, 10, 11] pct_file+20: [2015, 2, 23] grant+17: [2018, 1, 30]	Koninklijke Philips Electronics N.V.
6792001	21 September 2000	14 September 2004	23 February 1995	24 May 2017	Method and device for transmitting data packets	U.S. patent 6,792,001 file+20: [2020, 9, 21] related_patent+20: [2015, 2, 23] Override: Auto parse missed date term extension 821 days (Note: Case Text: CROSS REFERENCE TO RELATED APPLICATIONS This is a continuation of application Ser. No. 08/537,701, filed Oct. 11, 1995 now U.S. Pat. No. 6,181,712 which is a 371 of PCT/IB95/00116 filed Feb. 23, 1995.)	Koninklijke Philips Electronics N.V.
RE37057	14 November 1994	21 May 1996	14 November 1994	14 November 2014	Apparatus and method for converting an HDTV signal to a non-HDTV signal	Reissue of 05519446 filed 18 May 1998 granted 20 February 2001; U.S. patent RE37057 file+20: [2014, 11, 14] related_patent+20: [2014, 11, 32] grant+17: [2013, 5, 21]	LG Electronics
RE37568	30 November 1993	1 April 1997	30 November 1993	1 April 2014	Inverse Quantizer	Reissue of 05617094 filed 31 March 1999 granted 5 March 2002; U.S. patent RE37568 file+20: [2013, 11, 30] related_patent+20: [2013, 11, 32] grant+17: [2014, 4, 1]	LG Electronics
5113255	11 May 1990	12 May 1992	11 May 1990	11 May 2010	Moving image signal encoding apparatus and decoding apparatus	U.S. patent 5,113,255 file+20: [2010, 5, 11] grant+17: [2009, 5, 12]	Matsushita
RE35910	11 May 1990	12 May 1992	11 May 1990	11 May 2010	Moving image signal encoding apparatus and decoding apparatus	Reissue of 05113255 filed 12 May 1994 granted 29 September 1998; U.S. patent RE35910 file+20: [2010, 5, 11] related_patent+20: [2010, 5, 32] grant+17: [2009, 5, 12]	Matsushita
RE36015	27 March 1992	8 March 1994	27 March 1992	27 March 2012	Apparatus and method for processing groups of fields in a video data compression system	Reissue of 05293229 filed 2 October 1995 granted 29 December 1998; U.S. patent RE36015 file+20: [2012, 3, 27] related_patent+20: [2012, 3, 32] grant+17: [2011, 3, 8]	Matsushita
RE36507	27 March 1992	8 March 1994	27 March 1992	27 March 2012	Apparatus and method for processing groups of fields in a video data compression system to encode a single frame as an I-field and a P-field	Reissue of 05293229 filed 21 October 1997 granted 18 January 2000; U.S. patent RE36507 file+20: [2012, 3, 27] related_patent+20: [2012, 3, 27] grant+17: [2011, 3, 8] (Note: Case Text: Application Ser. No 08/538,101, filed Oct. 2, 1995, now U.S. Pat. No. RE 36,015, and application Ser. No. 08/954,916, filed Oct. 21, 1997, are reissue applications of U.S. Pat. No. 5,293,229, which issues from application Ser. No. 07/859,145, filed Mar. 27, 1992.)	Matsushita
RE39276	20 July 1994	28 April 1998	2 November 1992	28 April 2015	Method for determining motion compensation	Reissue of 05745182 filed 27 April 2000 granted 12 September 2006; U.S. patent RE39276 file+20: [2014, 7, 20] related_patent+20: [2012, 11, 2] grant+17: [2015, 4, 28] (Note: Case Text: This is a reissue of U.S. Pat. No. 5,745,182 which is a division of application Ser. No. 07/970,046 filed Nov. 2, 1992, now U.S. Pat. No. 5,369,449. This application has the following co-pending related reissue applications: Ser. No. 09/833,680 filed Apr. 13, 2001, Ser. No. 09/833,769 filed Apr. 13, 2001, Ser. No. 09/833,770 filed Apr. 13, 2001, Ser. No. 09/866,811 filed May 30, 2001 and Ser. No. 10/895,283 filed Jul. 21, 2004.)	Matsushita
RE39278	20 July 1994	28 April 1998	2 November 1992	28 April 2015	Method for determining motion compensation	Reissue of 05745182 filed 13 April 2001 granted 12 September 2006; U.S. patent RE39278 file+20: [2014, 7, 20] related_patent+20: [2012, 11, 2] grant+17: [2015, 4, 28] (Note: Case Text: This is a reissue of U.S. Pat. No. 5,745,182 which is a division of application Ser. No. 07/970,046 filed Nov. 2, 1992, now U.S. Pat. No. 5,369,449. This application is a division of reissue application No. 09/559,627, filed Apr. 27, 2000 and has the following co-pending related reissue applications: 09/833,680 filed Apr. 13, 2001; 09/833,770 filed Apr. 13, 2001, 09/866,811 filed May 30, 2001, and 10/895,283 filed Jul. 21, 2004.)	Matsushita
RE39280	20 July 1994	28 April 1998	2 November 1992	28 April 2015	Method for determining motion compensation	Reissue of 05745182 filed 30 May 2001 granted 12 September 2006; U.S. patent RE39280 file+20: [2014, 7, 20] related_patent+20: [2012, 11, 2] grant+17: [2015, 4, 28] (Note: Case Text: This is a reissue of U.S. Pat. No. 5,745,182 which is a division of application Ser. No. 07/970,046 filed Nov. 2, 1992, now U.S. Pat. No. 5,369,449. This application is a division of reissue application Ser. No. 09/559,627, filed Apr. 27, 2000 and has the following co-pending related reissue applications: Ser. No. 09/833,680 filed Apr. 13, 2001, Ser. No. 09/833,769 filed Apr. 13, 2001, Ser. No. 09/833,770 filed Apr. 13, 2001, and Ser. No. 10/895,283 filed Jul. 21, 2004.)	Matsushita
5223949	17 April 1992	29 June 1993	17 April 1992	17 April 2012	Coding means for a signal processing system	U.S. patent 5,223,949 file+20: [2012, 4, 17] grant+17: [2010, 6, 29]	Matsushita
5412430	4 May 1994	2 May 1995	31 July 1992	31 July 2012	Image coding method and image coding apparatus	U.S. patent 5,412,430 file+20: [2014, 5, 4] related_patent+20: [2012, 7, 31] grant+17: [2012, 5, 2] (Note: Case Text: This application is a Continuation of now abandoned application, Ser. No. 07/922,772, filed Jul. 31, 1992, now abandoned.)	Matsushita
5784107	23 January 1996	21 July 1998	21 April 1992	21 April 2012	Method and apparatus for picture coding and method and apparatus for picture decoding	U.S. patent 5,784,107 file+20: [2016, 1, 23] related_patent+20: [2012, 4, 21] (Note: Case Text: This application is a continuation of application Ser. No. 08/157,627 filed Nov. 24, 1993 which is a continuation-in-part of Ser. No. 871,697, now U.S. Pat. No. 5,347,309 filed Apr. 21, 1992, now abandoned.)	Matsushita
4954892	4 October 1989	4 September 1990	4 October 1989	4 October 2009	Buffer controlled picture signal encoding and decoding system	U.S. patent 4,954,892 file+20: [2009, 10, 4] grant+17: [2007, 9, 4]	Mitsubishi
5072295	20 August 1990	10 December 1991	20 August 1990	20 August 2010	Adaptive quantization coder/decoder with limiter circuitry	U.S. patent 5,072,295 file+20: [2010, 8, 20] grant+17: [2008, 12, 10]	Mitsubishi
5268846	10 April 1991	7 December 1993	10 April 1991	10 April 2011	Method and apparatus for nonsequential multimedia data interchange in a data processing system	U.S. patent 5,268,846 file+20: [2011, 4, 10] grant+17: [2010, 12, 7]	Mitsubishi
5949489	31 July 1998	7 September 1999	16 October 1992	16 October 2012	Image signal coding system	U.S. patent 5,949,489 file+20: [2018, 7, 31] related_patent+20: [2012, 10, 16] (Note: Case Text: This application is a divisional of application Ser. No. 08/803,235, filed on Feb. 20, 1997, now U.S. Pat. No. 5,867,220, the entire contents of which are hereby incorporated by reference, which is a continuation of application Ser. No. 08/121,293, filed on Sep. 13, 1993, now U.S. Pat. No. 5,638,127, which is a division of application Ser. No. 07/962,299, filed on Oct. 16, 1992, now U.S. Pat. No. 5,274,442.)	Mitsubishi
5963258	31 July 1998	5 October 1999	16 October 1992	16 October 2012	Image signal coding system	U.S. patent 5,963,258 file+20: [2018, 7, 31] related_patent+20: [2012, 10, 16] (Note: Case Text: This application is a divisional of application Ser. No. 08/803,235, filed on Feb. 20, 1997, now U.S. Pat. No. 5,867,220, the entire contents of which are hereby incorporated by reference, which is a continuation of application Ser. No. 08/121,293, filed on Sep. 13, 1993, now U.S. Pat. No. 5,638,127, which is a continuation of application Ser. No. 07/962,299, filed on Oct. 16, 1992, now U.S. Pat. No. 5,274,442.)	Mitsubishi
5970175	26 October 1998	19 October 1999	16 October 1992	16 October 2012	Image signal coding system	U.S. patent 5,970,175 file+20: [2018, 10, 26] related_patent+20: [2012, 10, 16] (Note: Case Text: This application is a divisional of application Ser. No. 08/803,235 filed on Feb. 20, 1997, now U.S. Pat. No. 5,867,220, which is a continuation of application Ser. No. 08/121,293, filed Sep. 13, 1993, now U.S. Pat. No. 5,638,127, which is a divisional of application Ser. No. 07/962,299 filed Oct. 16, 1992, now U.S. Pat. No. 5,274,442, the entire contents of which are hereby incorporated by reference.)	Mitsubishi
5990960	9 December 1998	23 November 1999	16 October 1992	16 October 2012	Image signal coding system	U.S. patent 5,990,960 file+20: [2018, 12, 9] related_patent+20: [2012, 10, 16] (Note: Case Text: This application is a divisional of application Ser. No. 08/803,235, filed on Feb. 20, 1997, now U.S. Pat. No. 5,867,220 which is a continuation of application Ser. No. 08/121,293, filed Sep. 13, 1993, now U.S. Pat. No. 5,638,127, which is a divisional of application Ser. No. 07/962,299 filed Oct. 16, 1992, now U.S. Pat. No. 5,274,442, the entire contents of which is hereby incorporated by reference.)	Mitsubishi
6002439	27 May 1999	14 December 1999	16 October 1992	16 October 2012	Image signal coding system	U.S. patent 6,002,439 file+20: [2019, 5, 27] related_patent+20: [2012, 10, 16] (Note: Case Text: This application is a divisional of co-pending application Ser. No. 09/207,919, filed on Dec. 9, 1998, now allowed, which is a continuation of application Ser. No. 08/803,235, filed Feb. 20, 1997, now U.S. Pat. No. 5,867,220, which is a continuation of application Ser. No. 08/121,293, filed Sep. 13, 1993, now U.S. Pat. No. 5,638,127, which is a divisional of application Ser. No. 07/962,299, filed Oct. 16, 1992, now U.S. Pat. No. 5,274,442, the entire contents of which are hereby incorporated by reference.)	Mitsubishi
6097759	22 November 1999	1 August 2000	16 October 1992	16 October 2012	Image signal coding system	U.S. patent 6,097,759 file+20: [2019, 11, 22] related_patent+20: [2012, 10, 16] (Note: Case Text: This application is a divisional of application Ser. No. 09/207,919, filed on Dec. 9, 1998, now U.S. Pat. No. 5,990,960, which is a divisional of application Ser. No. 08/803,235, filed on Feb. 20, 1997, now U.S. Pat. No. 5,867,220, which is a continuation of application Ser. No. 08/121,293, filed on Sep. 13, 1993, now U.S. Pat. No. 5,638,127, which is a divisional of application Ser. No. 07/962,299, filed on Oct. 16, 1992, now U.S. Pat. No. 5,274,442, the entire contents of which are hereby incorporated by reference.)	Mitsubishi
6188794	20 May 1999	13 February 2001	16 October 1992	16 October 2012	Image signal coding system	U.S. patent 6,188,794 file+20: [2019, 5, 20] related_patent+20: [2012, 10, 16] (Note: Case Text: This application is a divisional of application Ser. No. 09/178,619 filed Oct. 26, 1998 now U.S. Pat. No. 5,427,678, now allowed, which is a Div. of Ser. No. 08/803,235 filed Feb. 20, 1997, U.S. Pat. No. 5,867,220, which is a Cont. of Ser. No. 08/121,293 filed Sep. 13, 1993, U.S. Pat. No. 5,638,127, which is a Div. of Ser. No. 07/962,299 filed Oct. 16, 1992, U.S. Pat. No. 5,274,442.)	Mitsubishi
6307973	4 December 2000	23 October 2001	16 October 1992	16 October 2012	Image signal coding system	U.S. patent 6,307,973 file+20: [2020, 12, 4] related_patent+20: [2012, 10, 16] term extension 0 days (Note: Case Text: This application is a divisional application under 37 C.F.R. .sctn. 1.53(b) of prior application Ser. No. 09/315,038 filed May 20, 1999, now U.S. Pat. No. 6,188,794 which is a divisional of application Ser. No. 09/178,619 filed Oct. 26, 1998, now U.S. Pat. No. 5,970,175, which is a divisional of application Ser. No. 08/803,235 filed Feb. 20, 1997, now U.S. Pat. No. 5,867,220 which is a continuation of application Ser. No. 08/121,293 filed Sep. 13, 1993, now U.S. Pat. No. 5,638,127, which is a divisional of application Ser. No. 07/962,299 filed Oct. 16, 1992, now U.S. Pat. No. 5,274,442, the entire contents of which are hereby incorporated by reference.)	Mitsubishi
7362805	2 March 2006	22 April 2008	29 January 1993	29 January 2013	High efficiency encoder and video information recording/reproducing apparatus	U.S. patent 7,362,805 file+20: [2026, 3, 2] related_patent+20: [2013, 1, 29] term extension 0 days (Note: Case Text: This application is a divisional of co-pending application Ser. No. 10/372,212 filed on Feb. 25, 2003, which is a divisional of application Ser. No. 09/271,458, filed on Mar. 18, 1999, now U.S. Pat. No. 6,870,884 B1, which is a divisional of application Ser. No. 09/113,287, filed Jul. 10, 1998, now U.S. Pat. No. 5,909,252, which is a divisional of application Ser. No. 08/559,488, filed Nov. 15, 1995, now U.S. Pat. No. 5,841,474, which is a divisional of application Ser. No. 08/011,243, filed on Jan. 29, 1993, now U.S. Pat. No. 5,479,264, the entire contents of which are hereby incorporated by reference and for which priority is claimed under 35 U.S.C. .sctn. 120; and this application claims priority of Application No. 4-013719, 4-037599, 4-037821, and 4-043075 filed in Japan on Jan. 29, 1992; Feb. 25, 1992; Feb. 25, 1992 and Feb. 28, 1992 under 35 U.S.C. .sctn. 119.)	Mitsubishi
7376184	4 November 2002	20 May 2008	29 January 1993	31 May 2014	High-efficiency encoder and video information recording/reproducing apparatus	U.S. patent 7,376,184 file+20: [2022, 11, 4] related_patent+20: [2013, 1, 29] term extension 487 days (Note: Case Text: This application is a divisional of application Ser. No. 09/271,458, filed on Mar. 18, 1999 now U.S. Pat. No. 6,870,884, which is a divisional of application Ser. No. 09/113,287, filed Jul. 10, 1998 now U.S. Pat. No. 5,909,252, which is a divisional of application Ser. No. 08/559,488, filed Nov. 15, 1995 now U.S. Pat. No. 5,841,474, which is a divisional of application Ser. No. 08/011,243, filed on Jan. 29, 1993 now U.S. Pat. No. 5,479,264, the entire contents of which are hereby incorporated by reference and for which priority is claimed under 35 U.S.C. .sctn. 120; and this application claims priority of application No. 4-013719, 4-037599, 4-037821, and 4-043075 filed in Japan on Jan. 29, 1992; Feb. 25, 1992; Feb. 25, 1992 and Feb. 28, 1992 under 35 U.S.C. .sctn. 119.)	Mitsubishi
7756202	30 October 2007	13 July 2010	29 January 1993	6 August 2013	High-efficiency encoder and video information recording/reproducing apparatus	U.S. patent 7,756,202 file+20: [2027, 10, 30] related_patent+20: [2013, 1, 29] term extension 189 days (Note: Case Text: This application is a Continuation of application Ser. No. 11/276,501 filed on Mar. 2, 2006 now U.S. Pat. No. 7,362,805 which is a divisional of application Ser. No. 10/372,212 filed on Feb. 25, 2003 now U.S. Pat. No. 7,336,708, which is a divisional of application Ser. No. 09/271,458, filed on Mar. 18, 1999 now U.S. Pat. No. 6,870,884, which is a divisional of application Ser. No. 09/113,287, filed Jul. 10, 1998 now U.S. Pat. No. 5,909,252, which is a divisional of application Ser. No. 08/559,488, filed Nov. 15, 1995 now U.S. Pat. No. 5,841,474, which is a divisional of application Ser. No. 08/011,243, filed on Jan. 29, 1993 now U.S. Pat. No. 5,479,264, the entire contents of which are hereby incorporated by reference and for which priority is claimed under 35 U.S.C. .sctn.120; and this application claims priority of Application No. 4-013719, 4-037599, 4-037821, and 4-043075 filed in Japan on Jan. 29, 1992; Feb. 25, 1992; Feb. 25, 1992 and Feb. 28, 1992 under 35 U.S.C. .sctn.119.)	Mitsubishi
7936817	30 October 2007	3 May 2011	29 January 1993	29 January 2013	High-efficiency encoder and video information recording/reproducing apparatus	U.S. patent 7,936,817 file+20: [2027, 10, 30] related_patent+20: [2013, 1, 29] (Note: Case Text: This application is a Continuation of application Ser. No. 11/276,501 filed on Mar. 2, 2006, now U.S. Pat. No. 7,362,805 which is a divisional of application Ser. No. 10/372,212 filed on Feb. 25, 2003, now U.S. Pat. No. 7,336,708 which is a divisional of application Ser. No. 09/271,458, filed on Mar. 18, 1999, now U.S. Pat. No. 6,870,884 which is a divisional of application Ser. No. 09/113,287, filed Jul. 10, 1998, now U.S. Pat. No. 5,909,252 which is a divisional of application Ser. No. 08/559,488, filed Nov. 15, 1995, now U.S. Pat. No. 5,841,474 which is a divisional of application Ser. No. 08/011,243, filed on Jan. 29, 1993, now U.S. Pat. No. 5,479,264 the entire contents of which are hereby incorporated by reference and for which priority is claimed under 35 U.S.C. .sctn.120; and this application claims priority of Application No. 4-013719, 4-037599, 4-037821, and 4-043075 filed in Japan on Jan. 29, 1992; Feb. 25, 1992; Feb. 25, 1992 and Feb. 28, 1992 under 35 U.S.C. .sctn.119.)	Mitsubishi
4958226	27 September 1989	18 September 1990	27 September 1989	27 September 2009	Conditional motion compensated interpolation of digital motion video	U.S. patent 4,958,226 file+20: [2009, 9, 27] grant+17: [2007, 9, 18]	Multimedia Patent Trust
5227878	15 November 1991	13 July 1993	15 November 1991	15 November 2011	Adaptive coding and decoding of frames and fields of video	U.S. patent 5,227,878 file+20: [2011, 11, 15] grant+17: [2010, 7, 13]	Multimedia Patent Trust
5500678	18 March 1994	19 March 1996	18 March 1994	18 March 2014	Optimized scanning of transform coefficients in video coding	U.S. patent 5,500,678 file+20: [2014, 3, 18] grant+17: [2013, 3, 19]	Multimedia Patent Trust
5563593	18 March 1994	8 October 1996	18 March 1994	18 March 2014	Video coding with optimized low complexity variable length codes	U.S. patent 5,563,593 file+20: [2014, 3, 18] grant+17: [2013, 10, 8]	Multimedia Patent Trust
4849812	24 February 1988	18 July 1989	24 February 1988	24 February 2008	Television system, in which digitized picture signals subjected to a transform coding are transmitted from an encoding station to a decoding station	U.S. patent 4,849,812 file+20: [2008, 2, 24] grant+17: [2006, 7, 18]	Philips
4901075	11 September 1987	13 February 1990	11 September 1987	11 September 2007	Method and apparatus for bit rate reduction	U.S. patent 4,901,075 file+20: [2007, 9, 11] grant+17: [2007, 2, 13]	Philips
5021879	24 September 1990	4 June 1991	25 April 1988	4 June 2008	System for transmitting video pictures	U.S. patent 5,021,879 file+20: [2010, 9, 24] related_patent+20: [2008, 4, 25] grant+17: [2008, 6, 4] (Note: Case Text: This is a continuation of application Ser. No. 442,475, filed Nov. 22, 1989 which is a continuation of Ser. No. 185,608 filed Apr. 25, 1988, now abandoned.)	Philips
5027206	13 September 1989	25 June 1991	13 September 1989	13 September 2009	High-definition television systems	U.S. patent 5,027,206 file+20: [2009, 9, 13] grant+17: [2008, 6, 25]	Philips
5128758	2 June 1989	7 July 1992	2 June 1989	7 July 2009	Method and apparatus for digitally processing a high definition television augmentation signal	U.S. patent 5,128,758 file+20: [2009, 6, 2] grant+17: [2009, 7, 7]	Philips
5179442	26 November 1990	12 January 1993	2 June 1989	12 January 2010	Method and apparatus for digitally processing a high definition television augmentation signal	U.S. patent 5,179,442 file+20: [2010, 11, 26] related_patent+20: [2009, 6, 2] grant+17: [2010, 1, 12] (Note: Case Text: This application is a continuation of U.S. application Ser. No. 361,523 filed Jun. 2, 1989, now U.S. Pat. No. 5,128,758. The contents of this application is specifically incorporated herein by reference.)	Philips
5333135	1 February 1993	26 July 1994	1 February 1993	1 February 2013	Identification of a data stream transmitted as a sequence of packets	U.S. patent 5,333,135 file+20: [2013, 2, 1] grant+17: [2011, 7, 26]	Philips
5606539	31 August 1994	25 February 1997	5 June 1991	25 February 2014	Method and apparatus for encoding and decoding an audio and/or video signal, and a record carrier for use with such apparatus	U.S. patent 5,606,539 file+20: [2014, 8, 31] related_patent+20: [2011, 6, 5] grant+17: [2014, 2, 25] (Note: Case Text: CROSS REFERENCE TO RELATED APPLICATIONS This is a continuation of Application Ser. No. 08/086,402, filed Jun. 30, 1993 and now abandoned, which was a continuation of Application Ser. No. 07/711,186, filed Jun. 5, 1991 and now abandoned.)	Philips
5608697	18 March 1996	4 March 1997	5 June 1991	5 June 2011	Record carrier containing an audio and/or video signal which has been encoded and includes a decoder delay time parameter indicating a time delay for one or more portions of the signal	U.S. patent 5,608,697 file+20: [2016, 3, 18] related_patent+20: [2011, 6, 5] (Note: Case Text: CROSS REFERENCE TO RELATED APPLICATIONS This is a division of application Ser. No. 08/299,027, filed on Aug. 31, 1994, which is a continuation of application Ser. No. 08/086,402, filed Jun. 30, 1993 and now abandoned, which was a continuation of application Ser. No. 07/711,186, filed Jun. 5, 1991 and now abandoned.)	Philips
5740310	28 June 1994	14 April 1998	30 May 1991	14 April 2015	Method of maintaining display continuity from a CD with slow-motion or freeze capability	U.S. patent 5,740,310 file+20: [2014, 6, 28] related_patent+20: [2011, 5, 30] grant+17: [2015, 4, 14] (Note: Case Text: This is a continuation of application Ser. No. 07/707,527, filed May 30, 1991, now abandoned.)	Philips
5844867	9 September 1996	1 December 1998	5 June 1991	5 June 2011	Methods and apparatus for encoding and decoding an audio and/or video signal, and a record carrier used therewith or produced therefrom	U.S. patent 5,844,867 file+20: [2016, 9, 9] related_patent+20: [2011, 6, 5] (Note: Case Text: CROSS REFERENCE TO RELATED APPLICATIONS This is a continuation of application Ser. No. 08/299,027, filed on Aug. 31, 1994, now U.S. Pat. No. 5,606,539, which is a continuation of application Ser. No. 08/086,402, filed Jun. 30, 1993 and now abandoned, which was a continuation of application Ser. No. 07/711,186, filed Jun. 5, 1991 and now abandoned.)	Philips
5461421	29 November 1993	24 October 1995	29 November 1993	29 November 2013	Encoding and decoding method and apparatus thereof	U.S. patent 5,461,421 file+20: [2013, 11, 29] grant+17: [2012, 10, 24]	Samsung
5467086	18 June 1993	14 November 1995	18 June 1993	18 June 2013	Apparatus and method of coding/decoding video data	U.S. patent 5,467,086 file+20: [2013, 6, 18] grant+17: [2012, 11, 14]	Samsung
5654706	18 December 1996	5 August 1997	15 July 1993	15 July 2013	System for variable length decoding digital transmission data which has been compressed by selecting a scanning pattern	U.S. patent 5,654,706 file+20: [2016, 12, 18] related_patent+20: [2013, 7, 15] (Note: Case Text: This is a continuation of application Ser. No. 08/532,987 filed Sep. 22, 1995, now U.S. Pat. No. 5,602,549 which is a Continuation Application of prior application Ser. No. 08/095,468, Jul. 15, 1993, now U.S. Pat. No. 5,497,153.)	Samsung
6680975	2 November 2000	20 January 2004	1 March 1993	12 March 2014	Signal encoding and decoding system and method	U.S. patent 6,680,975 file+20: [2020, 11, 2] related_patent+20: [2013, 3, 1] term extension 376 days (Note: Case Text: This is a Continuation of application Ser. No. 08/024,305 filed Mar. 1, 1993 now U.S. Pat. No. 6,263,026, the disclosure of which is incorporated herein by reference.)	Samsung
7292657	3 July 2003	6 November 2007	1 March 1993	1 March 2013	Signal compressing signal	U.S. patent 7,292,657 file+20: [2023, 7, 3] related_patent+20: [2013, 3, 1] (Note: Case Text: This is a Continuation of application Ser. No. 09/703,649 filed Nov. 2, 2000; now U.S. Pat. No. 6,680,975 which is a Continuation of application Ser. No. 08/024,305 filed Mar. 1, 1993; now U.S. Pat. No. 6,263,026 the disclosures of which are incorporated herein by reference.)	Samsung
7609760	5 January 2009	27 October 2009	1 March 1993	1 March 2013	Signal compressing system	U.S. patent 7,609,760 file+20: [2029, 1, 5] related_patent+20: [2013, 3, 1] Override: Autoparse missed application Ser. No. 08/024,305, filed Mar. 1, 1993. term extension 0 days (Note: Case Text: CROSS-REFERENCES TO RELATED PATENT APPLICATIONS This is a Continuation Application of application Ser. No. 11/873,282, filed Oct. 16, 2007; which is a Continuation Application of application Ser. No. 10/612,013, filed Jul. 3, 2003, and issued on Nov. 6, 2007, as U.S. Pat. No. 7,292,657; which is a Continuation Application of application Ser. No. 09/703,649, filed Nov. 2, 2000, and issued Jan. 20, 2004, as U.S. Pat. No. 6,680,975; which is a Continuation Application of application Ser. No. 08/024,305, filed Mar. 1, 1993, and issued on Jul. 17, 2001, as U.S. Pat. No. 6,263,026; the disclosures of which are incorporated herein by reference. One (1) Reissue application Ser. No. 10/609,438, filed on Jul. 1, 2003, of U.S. Pat. No. 6,263,026 has been abandoned. Continuation application Ser. No. 12/338,647, filed Dec. 18, 2008 is a Continuation application of Ser. No. 11/873,282, filed Oct. 16, 2007. Continuation application Ser. Nos. 12/343,797, 12/343,839, and 12/343,898, all filed on Dec. 24, 2008, are Continuation Applications of Ser. No. 11/873,282, filed Oct. 16, 2007.)	Samsung
7616687	5 January 2009	10 November 2009	1 March 1993	1 March 2013	Signal compressing system	U.S. patent 7,616,687 file+20: [2029, 1, 5] related_patent+20: [2013, 3, 1] Override: Autoparse missed application Ser. No. 08/024,305, filed Mar. 1, 1993. term extension 0 days (Note: Case Text: CROSS-REFERENCES TO RELATED PATENT APPLICATIONS This is a Continuation Application of application Ser. No. 11/873,282, filed Oct. 16, 2007; which is a Continuation Application of application Ser. No. 10/612,013, filed Jul. 3, 2003, and issued on Nov. 6, 2007, as U.S. Pat. No. 7,292,657; which is a Continuation Application of application Ser. No. 09/703,649, filed Nov. 2, 2000, and issued Jan. 20, 2004, as U.S. Pat. No. 6,680,975; which is a Continuation Application of application Ser. No. 08/024,305, filed Mar. 1, 1993, and issued on Jul. 17, 2001, as U.S. Pat. No. 6,263,026; the disclosures of which are incorporated herein by reference. One (1) Reissue application Ser. No. 10/609,438, filed on Jul. 1, 2003, of U.S. Pat. No. 6,263,026 has been abandoned. Continuation application Ser. No. 12/338,647, filed Dec. 18, 2008 is a Continuation Application of Ser. No. 11/873,282, filed Oct. 16, 2007. Continuation application Ser. Nos. 12/343,797, 12/343,839, and 12/343,898, all filed on Dec. 24, 2008, are Continuation Applications of Ser. No. 11/873,282, filed Oct. 16, 2007.)	Samsung
7684490	18 December 2008	23 March 2010	1 March 1993	1 March 2013	Signal compressing system	U.S. patent 7,684,490 file+20: [2028, 12, 18] related_patent+20: [2013, 3, 1] Override: Autoparse missed application Ser. No. 08/024,305, filed Mar. 1, 1993. term extension 0 days (Note: Case Text: CROSS-REFERENCES TO RELATED PATENT APPLICATIONS This is a Continuation Application of application Ser. No. 11/873,282, filed Oct. 16, 2007 now abandoned; which is a Continuation Application of application Ser. No. 10/612,013, filed Jul. 3, 2003, and issued on Nov. 6, 2007, as U.S. Pat. No. 7,292,657; which is a Continuation Application of application Ser. No. 09/703,649, filed Nov. 2, 2000, and issued Jan. 20, 2004, as U.S. Pat. No. 6,680,975; which is a Continuation Application of application Ser. No. 08/024,305, filed Mar. 1, 1993, and issued on Jul. 17, 2001, as U.S. Pat. No. 6,263,026; the disclosures of which are incorporated herein by reference. One (1) Reissue application Ser. No. 10/609,438, filed on Jul. 1, 2003, of U.S. Pat. No. 6,263,026 has been abandoned.)	Samsung
7724821	24 December 2008	25 May 2010	1 March 1993	1 March 2013	Signal compressing system	U.S. patent 7,724,821 file+20: [2028, 12, 24] related_patent+20: [2013, 3, 1] Override: Autoparse missed application Ser. No. 08/024,305, filed Mar. 1, 1993. term extension 0 days (Note: Case Text: CROSS-REFERENCES TO RELATED PATENT APPLICATIONS This is a Continuation Application of application Ser. No. 11/873,282, filed Oct. 16, 2007 now abandoned; which is a Continuation Application of application Ser. No. 10/612,013, filed Jul. 3, 2003, and issued on Nov. 6, 2007, as U.S. Pat. No. 7,292,657; which is a Continuation Application of application Ser. No. 09/703,649, filed Nov. 2, 2000, and issued Jan. 20, 2004, as U.S. Pat. No. 6,680,975; which is a Continuation Application of application Ser. No. 08/024,305, filed Mar. 1, 1993, and issued on Jul. 17, 2001, as U.S. Pat. No. 6,263,026; the disclosures of which are incorporated herein by reference. One (1) Reissue Application Ser. No. 10/609,438, filed on Jul. 1, 2003, of U.S. Pat. No. 6,263,026 has been abandoned. Continuation application Ser. No. 12,338,647, filed Dec. 18, 2008 is a Continuation Application of Ser. No. 11/873,282, filed Oct. 16, 2007.)	Samsung
7724822	24 December 2008	25 May 2010	1 March 1993	1 March 2013	Signal compressing system	U.S. patent 7,724,822 file+20: [2028, 12, 24] related_patent+20: [2013, 3, 1] Override: Autoparse missed application Ser. No. 08/024,305, filed Mar. 1, 1993. term extension 0 days (Note: Case Text: CROSS-REFERENCES TO RELATED PATENT APPLICATIONS This is a Continuation Application of application Ser. No. 11/873,282, filed Oct. 16, 2007 now abandoned; which is a Continuation Application of application Ser. No. 10/612,013, filed Jul. 3, 2003, and issued on Nov. 6, 2007, as U.S. Pat. No. 7,292,657; which is a Continuation Application of application Ser. No. 09/703,649, filed Nov. 2, 2000, and issued Jan. 20, 2004, as U.S. Pat. No. 6,680,975; which is a Continuation Application of application Ser. No. 08/024,305, filed Mar. 1, 1993, and issued on Jul. 17, 2001, as U.S. Pat. No. 6,263,026; the disclosures of which are incorporated herein by reference. One (1) Reissue application Ser. No. 10/609,438, filed on Jul. 1, 2003, of U.S. Pat. No. 6,263,026 has been abandoned. Continuation Application No. 12,338,647, filed Dec. 18, 2008 is a Continuation Application of 11/873,282, filed Oct. 16, 2007.)	Samsung
7724823	24 December 2008	25 May 2010	1 March 1993	1 March 2013	Signal compressing system	U.S. patent 7,724,823 file+20: [2028, 12, 24] related_patent+20: [2013, 3, 1] Override: Autoparse missed application Ser. No. 08/024,305, filed Mar. 1, 1993. term extension 0 days (Note: Case Text: CROSS-REFERENCES TO RELATED PATENT APPLICATIONS This is a Continuation Application of application Ser. No. 11/873,282, filed Oct. 16, 2007 now abandoned; which is a Continuation Application of application Ser. No. 10/612,013, filed Jul. 3, 2003, and issued on Nov. 6, 2007, as U.S. Pat. No. 7,292,657; which is a Continuation Application of application Ser. No. 09/703,649, filed Nov. 2, 2000, and issued Jan. 20, 2004, as U.S. Pat. No. 6,680,975; which is a Continuation Application of application Ser. No. 08/024,305, filed Mar. 1, 1993, and issued on Jul. 17, 2001, as U.S. Pat. No. 6,263,026; the disclosures of which are incorporated herein by reference. One (1) Reissue application Ser. No. 10/609,438, filed on Jul. 1, 2003, of U.S. Pat. No. 6,263,026 has been abandoned. Continuation application Ser. No. 12,338,647, filed Dec. 18, 2008 is a Continuation application Ser. No. 11/873,282, filed Oct. 16, 2007.)	Samsung
7724824	5 January 2009	25 May 2010	1 March 1993	1 March 2013	Signal compressing system	U.S. patent 7,724,824 file+20: [2029, 1, 5] related_patent+20: [2013, 3, 1] Override: Autoparse missed application Ser. No. 08/024,305, filed Mar. 1, 1993. term extension 0 days (Note: Case Text: CROSS-REFERENCES TO RELATED PATENT APPLICATIONS This is a Continuation application of application Ser. No. 11/873,282, filed Oct. 16, 2007 now abandoned; which is a Continuation Application of application Ser. No. 10/612,013, filed Jul. 3, 2003, and issued on Nov. 6, 2007, as U.S. Pat. No. 7,292,657; which is a Continuation Application of application Ser. No. 09/703,649, filed Nov. 2, 2000, and issued Jan. 20, 2004, as U.S. Pat. No. 6,680,975; which is a Continuation Application of application Ser. No. 08/024,305, filed Mar. 1, 1993, and issued on Jul. 17, 2001, as U.S. Pat. No. 6,263,026; the disclosures of which are incorporated herein by reference. One (1) Reissue application Ser. No. 10/609,438, filed on Jul. 1, 2003, of U.S. Pat. No. 6,263,026 has been abandoned. Continuation application Ser. No. 12/338,647, filed Dec. 18, 2008 is a Continuation application of Ser. No. 11/873,282, filed Oct. 16, 2007. Continuation application Ser. Nos. 12/343,797, 12/343,839, and 12/343,898, all filed on Dec. 24, 2008, are Continuation applications of Ser. No. 11/873,282, filed Oct. 16, 2007.)	Samsung
7724828	16 November 2009	25 May 2010	1 March 1993	1 March 2013	Signal compressing system	U.S. patent 7,724,828 file+20: [2029, 11, 16] related_patent+20: [2013, 3, 1] term extension 0 days (Note: Case Text: CROSS-REFERENCES TO RELATED PATENT APPLICATIONS This is a Continuation Application of application Ser. No. 12/574,255, filed Oct. 6, 2009, which is a Continuation Application of Ser. No. 12/348,621, filed Jan. 5, 2009, issued as U.S. Pat. No. 7,616,687 on Nov. 10, 2009, which is a Continuation Application of application Ser. No. 11/873,282, filed Oct. 16, 2007; which is a Continuation Application of application Ser. No. 10/612,013, filed Jul. 3, 2003, and issued on Nov. 6, 2007, as U.S. Pat. No. 7,292,657; which is a Continuation Application of application Ser. No. 09/703,649, filed Nov. 2, 2000, and issued Jan. 20, 2004, as U.S. Pat. No. 6,680,975; which is a Continuation Application of application Ser. No. 08/024,305, filed Mar. 1, 1993, and issued on Jul. 17, 2001, as U.S. Pat. No. 6,263,026; the disclosures of which are incorporated herein by reference. One (1) Reissue application Ser. No. 10/609,438, filed on Jul. 1, 2003, of U.S. Pat. No. 6,263,026 has been abandoned. Continuation application Ser. No. 12/338,647, filed Dec. 18, 2008, Continuation application Ser. Nos. 12/343,797, 12/343,839, and 12/343,898, all filed on Dec. 24, 2008, Continuation application Ser. Nos. 12/348,510, 12/348,535, 12/348,539, 12/348,581, 12/348,590, and 12/348,621, all filed on Jan. 5, 2009, and Continuation application Ser. No. 12/497,264, filed on Jul. 2, 2009, are Continuation Applications of Ser. No. 11/873,282.)	Samsung
7724829	16 November 2009	25 May 2010	1 March 1993	1 March 2013	Signal compressing system	U.S. patent 7,724,829 file+20: [2029, 11, 16] related_patent+20: [2013, 3, 1] term extension 0 days (Note: Case Text: CROSS-REFERENCES TO RELATED PATENT APPLICATIONS This is a Continuation Application of application Ser. No. 12/574,255, filed Oct. 6, 2009, which is a Continuation application of 12/348,621, filed Jan. 5, 2009, issued as U.S. Pat. No. 7,616,687 on Nov. 10, 2009, which is a Continuation Application of application Ser. No. 11/873,282, filed Oct. 16, 2007; which is a Continuation Application of application Ser. No. 10/612,013, filed Jul. 3, 2003, and issued on Nov. 6, 2007, as U.S. Pat. No. 7,292,657; which is a Continuation Application of application Ser. No. 09/703,649, filed Nov. 2, 2000, and issued Jan. 20, 2004, as U.S. Pat. No. 6,680,975; which is a Continuation Application of application Ser. No. 08/024,305, filed Mar. 1, 1993, and issued on Jul. 17, 2001, as U.S. Pat. No. 6,263,026; the disclosures of which are incorporated herein by reference. One (1) Reissue application Ser. No. 10/609,438, filed on Jul. 1, 2003, of U.S. Pat. No. 6,263,026 has been abandoned. Continuation application Ser. No. 12/338,647, filed Dec. 18, 2008, Continuation application Ser. Nos. 12/343,797, 12/343,839, and 12/343,898, all filed on Dec. 24, 2008. Continuation application Ser. Nos. 12/348,510, 12/348,535, 12/348,539, 12/348,581, 12/348,590, and 12/348,621, all filed on Jan. 5, 2009, and Continuation application Ser. No. 12/497,264, filed on Jul. 2, 2009, are Continuation applications of Ser. No. 11/873,282.)	Samsung
7742522	5 January 2009	22 June 2010	1 March 1993	1 March 2013	Signal compressing system	U.S. patent 7,742,522 file+20: [2029, 1, 5] related_patent+20: [2013, 3, 1] Override: Autoparse missed application Ser. No. 08/024,305, filed Mar. 1, 1993. (Note: Case Text: CROSS-REFERENCES TO RELATED PATENT APPLICATIONS This is a Continuation Application of application Ser. No. 11/873,282, filed Oct. 16, 2007, now abandoned; which is a Continuation Application of application Ser. No. 10/612,013, filed Jul. 3, 2003, and issued on Nov. 6, 2007, as U.S. Pat. No. 7,292,657; which is a Continuation Application of application Ser. No. 09/703,649, filed Nov. 2, 2000, and issued Jan. 20, 2004, as U.S. Pat. No. 6,680,975; which is a Continuation Application of application Ser. No. 08/024,305, filed Mar. 1, 1993, and issued on Jul. 17, 2001, as U.S. Pat. No. 6,263,026; the disclosures of which are incorporated herein by reference. One (1) Reissue application Ser. No. 10/609,438, filed on Jul. 1, 2003, of U.S. Pat. No. 6,263,026 has been abandoned. Continuation application Ser. No. 12/338,647, filed Dec. 18, 2008 is a Continuation Application of Ser. No. 11/873,282, filed Oct. 16, 2007. Continuation application Ser. Nos. 12/343,797, 12/343,839, and 12/343,898, all filed on Dec. 24, 2008, are Continuation Applications of 11/873,282, filed Oct. 16, 2007.)	Samsung
7742527	5 January 2009	22 June 2010	1 March 1993	1 March 2013	Signal compressing system	U.S. patent 7,742,527 file+20: [2029, 1, 5] related_patent+20: [2013, 3, 1] Override: Autoparse missed application Ser. No. 08/024,305, filed Mar. 1, 1993. term extension 0 days (Note: Case Text: CROSS-REFERENCES TO RELATED PATENT APPLICATIONS This is a Continuation Application of application Ser. No. 11/873,282, filed Oct. 16, 2007 now abandoned; which is a Continuation Application of application Ser. No. 10/612,013, filed Jul. 3, 2003, and issued on Nov. 6, 2007, as U.S. Pat. No. 7,292,657; which is a Continuation Application of application Ser. No. 09/703,649, filed Nov. 2, 2000, and issued Jan. 20, 2004, as U.S. Pat. No. 6,680,975; which is a Continuation Application of application Ser. No. 08/024,305, filed Mar. 1, 1993, and issued on Jul. 17, 2001, as U.S. Pat. No. 6,263,026; the disclosures of which are incorporated herein by reference. One (1) Reissue application Ser. No. 10/609,438, filed on Jul. 1, 2003, of U.S. Pat. No. 6,263,026 has been abandoned. Continuation application Ser. No. 12/338,647, filed Dec. 18, 2008 is a Continuation Application of Ser. No. 11/873,282, filed Oct. 16, 2007. Continuation application Ser. Nos. 12/343,797, 12/343,839, and 12/343,898, all filed on Dec. 24, 2008, are Continuation Applications of Ser. No. 11/873,282, filed Oct. 16, 2007.)	Samsung
7764735	2 July 2009	27 July 2010	1 March 1993	1 March 2013	Signal compressing system	U.S. patent 7,764,735 file+20: [2029, 7, 2] related_patent+20: [2013, 3, 1] Override: Autoparse missed application Ser. No. 08/024,305, filed Mar. 1, 1993. (Note: Case Text: CROSS-REFERENCES TO RELATED PATENT APPLICATIONS This is a Continuation Application of application Ser. No. 11/873,282, filed Oct. 16, 2007 now abandoned; which is a Continuation Application of application Ser. No. 10/612,013, filed Jul. 3, 2003, and issued on Nov. 6, 2007, as U.S. Pat. No. 7,292,657; which is a Continuation Application of application Ser. No. 09/703,649, filed Nov. 2, 2000, and issued Jan. 20, 2004, as U.S. Pat. No. 6,680,975; which is a Continuation Application of application Ser. No. 08/024,305, filed Mar. 1, 1993, and issued on Jul. 17, 2001, as U.S. Pat. No. 6,263,026; the disclosures of which are incorporated herein by reference. One (1) Reissue application Ser. No. 10/609,438, filed on Jul. 1, 2003, of U.S. Pat. No. 6,263,026 has been abandoned. Continuation application Ser. No. 11/873,282 was filed on Oct. 16, 2007; Continuation application Ser. No. 12/338,647 was filed on Dec. 18, 2008; Continuation application Ser. Nos. 12/343,898, 12/343,797, and 12/343,839 were filed on Dec. 24, 2008; and Continuation application Ser. Nos. 12/348,590, 12/348,535, 12/343,539, 12/348,581, 12/348,621, 12/348,510 were filed on Jan. 5, 2009.)	Samsung
7782956	16 November 2009	24 August 2010	1 March 1993	1 March 2013	Signal compressing system	U.S. patent 7,782,956 file+20: [2029, 11, 16] related_patent+20: [2013, 3, 1] term extension 0 days (Note: Case Text: CROSS-REFERENCES TO RELATED PATENT APPLICATIONS This is a Continuation Application of application Ser. No. 12/574,255, filed Oct. 6, 2009, which is a Continuation Application of Ser. No. 12/348,621, filed Jan. 5, 2009, issued as U.S. Pat. No. 7,616,687 on Nov. 10, 2009, which is a Continuation Application of application Ser. No. 11/873,282, filed Oct. 16, 2007; which is a Continuation Application of application Ser. No. 10/612,013, filed Jul. 3, 2003, and issued on Nov. 6, 2007, as U.S. Pat. No. 7,292,657; which is a Continuation Application of application Ser. No. 09/703,649, filed Nov. 2, 2000, and issued Jan. 20, 2004, as U.S. Pat. No. 6,680,975; which is a Continuation Application of application Ser. No. 08/024,305, filed Mar. 1, 1993, and issued on Jul. 17, 2001, as U.S. Pat. No. 6,263,026; the disclosures of which are incorporated herein by reference. One (1) Reissue application Ser. No. 10/609,438, filed on Jul. 1, 2003, of U.S. Pat. No. 6,263,026 has been abandoned. Continuation Application No. Ser. No. 12/338,647, filed Dec. 18, 2008, Continuation Application Nos. Ser. No. 12/343,797, Ser. No. 12/343,839, and Ser. No. 12/343,898, all filed on Dec. 24, 2008, Continuation Application Nos. Ser. No. 12/348,510, Ser. No. 12/348,535, Ser. No. 12/348,539, Ser. No. 12/348,581, Ser. No. 12/348,590, and Ser. No. 12/348,621, all filed on Jan. 5, 2009, and Continuation Application No. Ser. No. 12/497,264, filed on Jul. 2, 2009, are Continuation Applications of Ser. No. 11/873,282.)	Samsung
7787538	5 January 2009	31 August 2010	1 March 1993	1 March 2013	Signal compressing system	U.S. patent 7,787,538 file+20: [2029, 1, 5] related_patent+20: [2013, 3, 1] Override: Autoparse missed application Ser. No. 08/024,305, filed Mar. 1, 1993. term extension 0 days (Note: Case Text: CROSS-REFERENCES TO RELATED PATENT APPLICATIONS This is a Continuation Application of application Ser. No. 11/873,282, filed Oct. 16, 2007 now abandoned; which is a Continuation Application of application Ser. No. 10/612,013, filed Jul. 3, 2003, and issued on Nov. 6, 2007, as U.S. Pat. No. 7,292,657; which is a Continuation Application of application Ser. No. 09/703,649, filed Nov. 2, 2000, and issued Jan. 20, 2004, as U.S. Pat. No. 6,680,975; which is a Continuation Application of application Ser. No. 08/024,305, filed Mar. 1, 1993, and issued on Jul. 17, 2001, as U.S. Pat. No. 6,263,026; the disclosures of which are incorporated herein by reference. One (1) Reissue application Ser. No. 10/609,438, filed on Jul. 1, 2003, of U.S. Pat. No. 6,263,026 has been abandoned. Continuation application Ser. No. 12/338,647, filed Dec. 18, 2008 is a Continuation Application of Ser. No. 11/873,282, filed Oct. 16, 2007. Continuation application Ser. Nos. 12/343,797, 12/343,839, and 12/343,898, all filed on Dec. 24, 2008, are Continuation Applications of Ser. No. 11/873,282, filed Oct. 16, 2007.)	Samsung
5418782	6 January 1994	23 May 1995	30 October 1992	30 October 2012	Methods and apparatus for providing virtual service selection in a multi-service communications system	U.S. patent 5,418,782 file+20: [2014, 1, 6] related_patent+20: [2012, 10, 30] grant+17: [2012, 5, 23] (Note: Case Text: CROSS REFERENCE TO RELATED APPLICATIONS This is a continuation-in-part of U.S. patent application Ser. No. 08/027,782, filed Mar. 8, 1993, now U.S. Pat. No. 5,359,601 entitled "Apparatus Providing Dynamic Virtual Service Selection in a Multi-Service Communications System" and of U.S. patent application Ser. No. 07/968,846, filed Oct. 30, 1992, now U.S. Pat. No. 5,400,401 entitled "System and Method for Transmitting a Plurality of Digital Services", both of which are hereby incorporated by reference.)	Scientific Atlanta
5420866	29 March 1994	30 May 1995	29 March 1994	29 March 2014	Methods for providing conditional access information to decoders in a packet-based multiplexed communications system	U.S. patent 5,420,866 file+20: [2014, 3, 29] grant+17: [2012, 5, 30]	Scientific Atlanta
5457701	6 January 1994	10 October 1995	6 January 1994	6 January 2014	Method for indicating packet errors in a packet-based multi-hop communications system	U.S. patent 5,457,701 file+20: [2014, 1, 6] grant+17: [2012, 10, 10]	Scientific Atlanta
4864393	31 May 1988	5 September 1989	31 May 1988	31 May 2008	Motion vector estimation in television images	U.S. patent 4,864,393 file+20: [2008, 5, 31] grant+17: [2006, 9, 5] (Note: Case Text: CROSS-REFERENCE TO RELATED APPLICATIONS This application is related to the following applications for U.S. Letters Patent, each of which was filed concurrently herewith, that is, on May 31, 1988, and has a common assignee herewith: Ser. No. 07/199,680 Ser. No. 07/199,681 Ser. No. 07/199,682 Ser. No. 07/200,421 Ser. No. 07/200,503 Ser. No. 07/200,531 Ser. No. 07/200,562.)	Sony
RE37222	12 October 1990	21 July 1992	12 October 1990	12 October 2010	Video signal transmitting system	Reissue of 05132792 filed 19 July 1994 granted 12 June 2001U.S. patent RE37222 file+20: [2010, 10, 12] related_patent+20: [2010, 10, 32] grant+17: [2009, 7, 21]	Sony
5191436	30 April 1991	2 March 1993	30 April 1991	30 April 2011	Method for recording coded motion picture data	U.S. patent 5,191,436 file+20: [2011, 4, 30] grant+17: [2010, 3, 2]	Sony
5291486	7 August 1992	1 March 1994	7 August 1992	7 August 2012	Data multiplexing apparatus and multiplexed data demultiplexing apparatus	U.S. patent 5,291,486 file+20: [2012, 8, 7] grant+17: [2011, 3, 1]	Sony
5298991	24 July 1992	29 March 1994	24 July 1992	24 July 2012	Variable length coding apparatus and method for motion vector	U.S. patent 5,298,991 file+20: [2012, 7, 24] grant+17: [2011, 3, 29]	Sony
5343248	16 July 1992	30 August 1994	16 July 1992	16 July 2012	Moving image compressing and recording medium and moving image data encoder and decoder	U.S. patent 5,343,248 file+20: [2012, 7, 16] grant+17: [2011, 8, 30]	Sony
5428396	27 December 1993	27 June 1995	24 July 1992	24 July 2012	Variable length coding/decoding method for motion vectors	U.S. patent 5,428,396 file+20: [2013, 12, 27] related_patent+20: [2012, 7, 24] grant+17: [2012, 6, 27] (Note: Case Text: This application is a continuation-in-part of U.S. patent application Ser. No. 07/918,010, filed on Jul. 24, 1992, now U.S. Pat. No. 5,293,991.)	Sony
5461420	17 September 1993	24 October 1995	17 September 1993	17 September 2013	Apparatus for coding and decoding a digital video signal derived from a motion picture film source	U.S. patent 5,461,420 file+20: [2013, 9, 17] grant+17: [2012, 10, 24]	Sony
5481553	28 February 1994	2 January 1996	28 February 1994	28 February 2014	Methods and apparatus for preventing rounding errors when transform coefficients representing a motion picture signal are inversely transformed	U.S. patent 5,481,553 file+20: [2014, 2, 28] grant+17: [2013, 1, 2]	Sony
5510840	15 May 1995	23 April 1996	30 August 1993	30 August 2013	Methods and devices for encoding and decoding frame signals and recording medium therefor	U.S. patent 5,510,840 file+20: [2015, 5, 15] related_patent+20: [2013, 8, 30] grant+17: [2013, 4, 23] (Note: Case Text: This is a continuation of application Ser. No. 08/098,280 filed on Aug. 30, 1993 abandoned.)	Sony
5539466	26 September 1994	23 July 1996	23 April 1993	23 July 2013	Efficient coding apparatus for picture signal and decoding apparatus therefor	U.S. patent 5,539,466 file+20: [2014, 9, 26] related_patent+20: [2013, 4, 32] grant+17: [2013, 7, 23] (Note: Case Text: This application is a continuation of application Ser. No. 08/030,019, filed as PCT/JP92/00956, Jul. 28, 1992 published as WO93/03578, Feb. 18, 1993, now abandoned.)	Sony
5543847	13 December 1993	6 August 1996	13 December 1993	13 December 2013	Picture coding and decoding method for random accessing	U.S. patent 5,543,847 file+20: [2013, 12, 13] grant+17: [2013, 8, 6]	Sony
5559557	28 September 1993	24 September 1996	28 September 1993	28 September 2013	Motion video coding with adaptive precision for DC component coefficient quantization and variable length coding	U.S. patent 5,559,557 file+20: [2013, 9, 28] grant+17: [2013, 9, 24]	Sony
5663763	18 October 1993	2 September 1997	18 October 1993	2 September 2014	Picture signal encoding method and apparatus and picture signal decoding method and apparatus	U.S. patent 5,663,763 file+20: [2013, 10, 18] grant+17: [2014, 9, 2]	Sony
5666461	30 May 1995	9 September 1997	21 April 1993	9 September 2014	High efficiency encoding and decoding of picture signals and recording medium containing same	U.S. patent 5,666,461 file+20: [2015, 5, 30] related_patent+20: [2013, 4, 21] grant+17: [2014, 9, 9] (Note: Case Text: This application is a division of application Ser. No. 08/084,642, filed Jun. 29, 1993 which is a continuation-in-part of application Ser. No. 08/030,019, filed in the United States Patent and Trademark Office on Apr. 21, 1993, and corresponding to International Application No. PCT/JP92/00956, the disclosure of which is incorporated herein.)	Sony
5701164	19 December 1996	23 December 1997	24 March 1994	24 March 2014	Macroblock coding including difference between motion vectors	U.S. patent 5,701,164 file+20: [2016, 12, 19] related_patent+20: [2014, 3, 24] Override: Auto parse missed PCT date (Note: Case Text: This application is a continuation of application Ser. No. 08/290,888, filed as PCT/JP94/00473 Mar. 24, 1994, now abandoned.)	Sony
5946042	2 July 1997	31 August 1999	24 March 1994	24 March 2014	Macroblock coding including difference between motion vectors	U.S. patent 5,946,042 file+20: [2017, 7, 2] related_patent+20: [2014, 3, 24] Override: Auto parse missed PCT date (Note: Case Text: This application is a division of application Ser. No. 08/770,585, filed Dec. 19, 1996, now U.S. Pat. No. 5,701,164, which is a continuation of application Ser. No. 08/290,888, filed Dec. 8, 1994.)	Sony
5982437	15 October 1993	9 November 1999	15 October 1993	9 November 2016	Coding method and system, and decoding method and system	U.S. patent 5,982,437 file+20: [2013, 10, 15] grant+17: [2016, 11, 9]	Sony
6040863	18 December 1998	21 March 2000	24 March 1994	24 March 2014	Method of coding and decoding motion vector and apparatus therefor, and method of coding and decoding picture signal and apparatus therefor	U.S. patent 6,040,863 file+20: [2018, 12, 18] related_patent+20: [2014, 3, 24] Override: Auto parse missed PCT date (Note: Case Text: This is a divisional of prior U.S. application Ser. No. 08/886,804 filed Jul. 2, 1997, now U.S. Pat. No. 5,946,042, which is a divisional of U.S. application Ser. No. 08/770,585 filed Dec. 19, 1996, now U.S. Pat. No. 5,701,164, which is a continuation of U.S. application Ser. No. 08/290,888 filed Dec. 8, 1994, now abandoned, which is a 371 of PCT/JP94/00473 filed Mar. 24, 1994.)	Sony
6160849	30 May 1995	12 December 2000	22 March 1993	12 December 2017	Selectable field and frame based predictive video coding	U.S. patent 6,160,849 file+20: [2015, 5, 30] related_patent+20: [2013, 3, 22] grant+17: [2017, 12, 12] (Note: Case Text: This application is a division of application Ser. No. 08/084,642, filed Jun. 29, 1993. This is a continuation-in-part of application Ser. No. 08/030,019, filed in the United States Patent and Trademark Office on Mar. 22, 1993, and corresponding to International Application No. PCT/JP92/00956, the disclosure of which is incorporated herein.)	Sony
7627041	30 June 2005	1 December 2009	13 January 1994	20 June 2016	Apparatus for encoding and decoding header data in picture signal transmission	U.S. patent 7,627,041 file+20: [2025, 6, 30] related_patent+20: [2014, 1, 13] Override: Error in original patent, fixed in correction B2 term extension 889 days (Note: Case Text: This is a continuation of application Ser. No. 08/634,122, filed Apr. 19, 1996 now U.S. Pat. No. 7,075,991, the entirety of which is incorporated herein by reference, which is a continuation of application Ser. No. 08/180,613 filed Jan. 13, 1994 now abandoned, the entirety of which is incorporated herein by reference.)	Sony
RE35093	3 December 1990	9 March 1993	3 December 1990	3 December 2010	Systems and methods for coding even fields of interlaced video sequences	Reissue of 05193004 filed 9 December 1994 granted 21 November 1995; U.S. patent RE35093 file+20: [2010, 12, 3] related_patent+20: [2010, 12, 32] grant+17: [2010, 3, 9] (Note: Case Text: This application is a continuation of application Ser. No. 08/218,970, filed on Mar. 25, 1994, now abandoned, and is a reissue of U.S. Pat. No. 5,193,004.)	The Trustees of Columbia University in the City of New York
4800432	24 October 1986	24 January 1989	24 October 1986	24 October 2006	Video Difference key generator	U.S. patent 4,800,432 file+20: [2006, 10, 24] grant+17: [2006, 1, 24]	Thomson
4969055	25 August 1988	6 November 1990	23 August 1986	6 November 2007	Method for recording and/or reproducing digitally coded signals with interframe and interframe coding	U.S. patent 4,969,055 file+20: [2008, 8, 25] related_patent+20: [2006, 8, 32] grant+17: [2007, 11, 6] (Note: Case Text: This application is a continuation of application Ser. No. 06/901,535, filed Aug. 8th, 1986now abandoned.)	Thomson
5289276	19 June 1992	22 February 1994	19 June 1992	19 June 2012	Method and apparatus for conveying compressed video data over a noisy communication channel	U.S. patent 5,289,276 file+20: [2012, 6, 19] grant+17: [2011, 2, 22]	Thomson
5365272	2 July 1993	15 November 1994	19 June 1992	19 June 2012	Method for formatting compressed video data into transport cells	U.S. patent 5,365,272 file+20: [2013, 7, 2] related_patent+20: [2012, 6, 19] grant+17: [2011, 11, 15] (Note: Case Text: This is a division of Ser. No. 07/901,045, filed Jun. 19, 1992. The present invention relates to a method and apparatus for segmenting compressed video data into cells or packets for transmission in a manner to allow a receiver to rapidly recover from occurrences of missing data or corrupted data.)	Thomson
5381181	13 May 1993	10 January 1995	13 May 1993	13 May 2013	Clock recovery apparatus as for a compressed video signal	U.S. patent 5,381,181 file+20: [2013, 5, 13] grant+17: [2012, 1, 10]	Thomson
5422676	22 October 1993	6 June 1995	22 October 1993	22 October 2013	System for coding an image representative signal	U.S. patent 5,422,676 file+20: [2013, 10, 22] grant+17: [2012, 6, 6]	Thomson
5442400	29 April 1993	15 August 1995	29 April 1993	29 April 2013	Error concealment apparatus for MPEG-like video data	U.S. patent 5,442,400 file+20: [2013, 4, 29] grant+17: [2012, 8, 15]	Thomson
5459789	22 April 1994	17 October 1995	22 April 1994	22 April 2014	Packet TV program component detector	U.S. patent 5,459,789 file+20: [2014, 4, 22] grant+17: [2012, 10, 17]	Thomson
5483287	3 August 1994	9 January 1996	19 June 1992	15 November 2011	Method for forming transport cells for conveying compressed video data	U.S. patent 5,483,287 file+20: [2014, 8, 3] related_patent+20: [2012, 6, 19] grant+17: [2013, 1, 9] terminal disclaimer date November 15, 2011 (Note: Case Text: This is a continuation of Ser. No. 08/085,364 filed 2 Jul. 1993, now U.S. Pat. No.5,365,272, which is a division of Ser. No. 901,045 filed Jun. 19, 1992, (now U.S. Pat. No. 5,289,276).)	Thomson
5565923	22 August 1995	15 October 1996	13 May 1993	13 May 2013	Apparatus for formatting a digital signal to include multiple time stamps for system synchronization	U.S. patent 5,565,923 file+20: [2015, 8, 22] related_patent+20: [2013, 5, 13] (Note: Case Text: This is a division of Ser. No. 08/060,924 filed May 13, 1993 now U.S. Pat. No. 5,486,864. This invention relates to a method and apparatus for providing a clock signal at a signal decompression apparatus, which clock signal is substantially frequency locked to a clock signal at an encoding apparatus.)	Thomson
5784110	23 May 1996	21 July 1998	30 November 1993	21 July 2015	Data processor for assembling transport data packets	U.S. patent 5,784,110 file+20: [2016, 5, 23] pct_file+20: [2013, 11, 30] grant+17: [2015, 7, 21]	Thomson
7020204	8 February 2002	28 March 2006	30 December 1988	30 January 2010	Adaptive method of encoding and decoding a series of pictures by transformation, and devices for implementing this method	U.S. patent 7,020,204 file+20: [2022, 2, 8] related_patent+20: [2008, 12, 30] term extension 396 days (Note: Case Text: CROSS REFERENCE TO RELATED APPLICATIONS This application is a divisional of application Ser. No. 09/978,376, filed Oct. 17, 2001, now U.S. Pat. No. 6,563,875, which is a continuation of application Ser. No. 07/408,515, filed Nov. 30, 1995 now abandoned claiming the benefit and priority of PCT International Application No. PCT/FR88/00649, filed Dec. 30, 1988, and French Application No. 87 18371, filed Dec. 30, 1987.)	Thomson
7334248	24 May 2002	19 February 2008	22 April 1994	14 February 2018	Conditional access filter as for a packet video signal inverse transport system	U.S. patent 7,334,248 file+20: [2022, 5, 24] related_patent+20: [2014, 4, 22] Override: Error in original patent, fixed in correction B2 term extension 1394 days.	Thomson
5317397	29 May 1992	31 May 1994	29 May 1992	29 May 2012	Predictive coding using spatial-temporal filtering and plural motion vectors	U.S. patent 5,317,397 file+20: [2012, 5, 29] grant+17: [2011, 5, 31]	Toshiba
5424779	24 November 1993	13 June 1995	29 May 1992	13 June 2012	Video coding apparatus	U.S. patent 5,424,779 file+20: [2013, 11, 24] related_patent+20: [2012, 5, 29] grant+17: [2012, 6, 13] (Note: Case Text: This is a continuation, of application Ser. No. 07/890,705, filed on May 29, 1992 now U.S. Pat. No. 5,317,397.)	Toshiba
5467136	17 February 1994	14 November 1995	29 May 1992	13 June 2012	Video decoder for determining a motion vector from a scaled vector and a difference vector	U.S. patent 5,467,136 file+20: [2014, 2, 17] related_patent+20: [2012, 5, 29] grant+17: [2012, 11, 14] terminal disclaimer date June 13, 2012 (Note: Case Text: CROSS-REFERENCE TO THE RELATED APPLICATION This application is a continuation-in-part of U.S. patent application Ser. No. 07/890,705 filed May 29, 1992, now U.S. Pat. No. 5,317,397.)	Toshiba
5742344	3 April 1996	21 April 1998	29 May 1992	29 May 2012	Motion compensated video decoding method and system for decoding a coded video signal using spatial and temporal filtering	U.S. patent 5,742,344 file+20: [2016, 4, 3] related_patent+20: [2012, 5, 29] (Note: Case Text: This is a Division of application Ser. No. 08/295,421 filed on Aug. 25, 1994, now U.S. Pat. No. 5,5,41,661, which is a continuation of application Ser. No. 08/156,709 filed on Nov. 24, 1993, now U.S. Pat. No. 5,424,779, which is a continuation of application Ser. No. 07/890,705 filed May 29, 1992, now U.S. Pat. No. 5,317,397.)	Toshiba
5986713	11 June 1998	16 November 1999	29 May 1992	29 May 2012	Video coding apparatus using inter-field prediction	U.S. patent 5,986,713 file+20: [2018, 6, 11] related_patent+20: [2012, 5, 29] (Note: Case Text: This application is a Continuation of application Ser. No. 09/054,403, filed on Apr. 3, 1998; which is a Division of Ser. No. 08/626,922 filed on Apr. 3, 1996, now U.S. Pat. No. 5,754,231; which is a Division of Ser. No. 08/295,421, filed on Aug. 25, 1994, now U.S. Pat. No. 5,541,661; which is a Continuation of Ser. No. 08/156,709, filed on Nov. 24, 1993, now U.S. Pat. No. 5,424,779; which is a Continuation of Ser. No. 07/890,705, filed on May 29, 1992, now U.S. Pat. No. 5,317,397.)	Toshiba
RE34965	18 January 1990	15 January 1991	18 January 1990	18 January 2010	Inter-frame predictive encoding system with encoded and transmitted prediction error	Reissue of 04985768 filed 14 January 1993 granted 13 June 1995; U.S. patent RE34965 file+20: [2010, 1, 18] related_patent+20: [2010, 1, 32] grant+17: [2008, 1, 15]	Victor Company
RE35158	26 April 1990	1 January 1991	16 January 1990	16 January 2010	Apparatus for adaptive inter-frame predictive encoding of video signal	Reissue of 04982285 filed 28 December 1992 granted 20 February 1996; U.S. patent RE35158 file+20: [2010, 4, 26] related_patent+20: [2010, 1, 16] grant+17: [2008, 1, 1] (Note: Case Text: The present application is a reissue of application No. 514,015 now U.S. Pat. No. 4,982,285, which is a .Icontinuation-in-part of a U.S. patent application (application number 465,747) with filing date Jan. 16, 1990, now U.S. Pat. No. 4,985,768.)	Victor Company
RE36822	17 June 1996	5 May 1998	6 November 1992	6 November 2012	Moving image signal coding apparatus and coded signal decoding apparatus	Reissue of 05748784 filed 2 October 1998 granted 15 August 2000; U.S. patent RE36822 file+20: [2016, 6, 17] related_patent+20: [2012, 11, 6] (Note: Case Text: This is a continuation of application Ser. No. 08/324,481, filed Oct. 18, 1994 which was abandoned upon the filing hereof, and which, in turn, is a continuation of application Ser. No. 07/972,564, filed Nov. 6, 1992 now abandoned.)	Victor Company
5103307	18 January 1991	7 April 1992	18 January 1991	18 January 2011	Interframe predictive coding/decoding system for varying interval between independent frames	U.S. patent 5,103,307 file+20: [2011, 1, 18] grant+17: [2009, 4, 7]	Victor Company
5175618	30 October 1991	29 December 1992	30 October 1991	30 October 2011	Compression method for interlace moving image signals	U.S. patent 5,175,618 file+20: [2011, 10, 30] grant+17: [2009, 12, 29]	Victor Company
5341457	20 August 1993	23 August 1994	30 December 1988	23 August 2011	Perceptual coding of audio signals	U.S. patent 5,341,457 file+20: [2013, 8, 20] related_patent+20: [2008, 12, 30] grant+17: [2011, 8, 23] (Note: Case Text: This application is a continuation of application Ser. No. 07/962,151, filed on Oct. 16, 1992 abandoned which is a cont. of Ser. No. 07/844,967 filed Feb. 28, 1992, now abandoned, which is a continuation of application Ser. No. 07/292,598 filed on Dec. 30, 1988, now abandoned, and claims priority thereto.)	Alcatel-Lucent
RE39080	22 September 1994	6 May 1997	30 December 1988	6 May 2014	Rate loop processor for perceptual encoder/decoder	Reissue of 05627938 filed 13 August 2002 granted 25 April 2006; U.S. patent RE39080 file+20: [2014, 9, 22] related_patent+20: [2008, 12, 30] grant+17: [2014, 5, 6] (Note: Case Text: This is a reissue application of U.S. Pat. No. 5,627,938 filed Sep. 22, 1994 as application Ser. No. 08/310,898 which .Iis a continuation of application Ser. No. 07/844,811, filed on Mar. 2, 1992, now abandoned, which is a continuation-in-part of application Ser. No. 07/844,967 filed Feb. 28, 1992, now abandoned, which is a continuation of Ser. No. 07/292,598 filed Dec. 30, 1988 now abandoned.)	Alcatel-Lucent
4972484	21 July 1988	20 November 1990	20 November 1987	20 November 2007	Method of transmitting or storing masked sub-band coded audio signals	U.S. patent 4,972,484 file+20: [2008, 7, 21] pct_file+20: [2007, 11, 20] grant+17: [2007, 11, 20]	Audio MPEG, Inc
5214678	31 May 1990	25 May 1993	31 May 1990	31 May 2010	Digital transmission system using subband coding of a digital signal	file+20: [2010, 5, 31] grant+17: [2010, 5, 25]	Audio MPEG, Inc
5323396	21 December 1992	21 June 1994	1 June 1990	21 June 2011	Digital transmission system, transmitter and receiver for use in the transmission system	U.S. patent 5,323,396 file+20: [2012, 12, 21] related_patent+20: [2010, 6, 1] grant+17: [2011, 6, 21] (Note: Case Text: This is a continuation of application Ser. No. 07/532,462 filed Jun. 1, 1990 now abandoned.)	Audio MPEG, Inc
5539829	7 June 1995	23 July 1996	1 June 1990	23 July 2013	Subband coded digital transmission system using some composite signals	U.S. patent 5,539,829 file+20: [2015, 6, 7] related_patent+20: [2010, 6, 1] grant+17: [2013, 7, 23] (Note: Case Text: This application is a division of U.S. patent application Ser. No. 08/173,850 filed Dec. 27, 1993, which is continuation of U.S. patent application Ser. No. 07/997,158 filed Dec. 21, 1992, now U.S. Pat. No. 5,323,396, which is a continuation of application Ser. No. 07/532,462 filed on Jun. 1, 1990 by Gerardus C. P. Lokhoff for DIGITAL TRANSMISSION SYSTEM, TRANSMITTER AND RECEIVER FOR USE IN THE TRANSMISSION SYSTEM, AND RECORD CARRIER OBTAINED BY MEANS OF THE TRANSMITTER IN THE FORM OF A RECORDING DEVICE, now abandoned.)	Audio MPEG, Inc
5606618	27 December 1993	25 February 1997	1 June 1990	25 February 2014	Subband coded digital transmission system using some composite signals	U.S. patent 5,606,618 file+20: [2013, 12, 27] related_patent+20: [2010, 6, 1] grant+17: [2014, 2, 25] (Note: Case Text: This application is a continuation of U.S. patent application Ser. No. 07/997,158 filed Dec. 21, 1992 now U.S Pat. No. 5,32,396, which is a continuation of application Ser. No. 07/532,462 filed on Jun. 1, 1990 by Gerardus C. P. Lokhoff for DIGITAL TRANSMISSION SYSTEM, TRANSMITTER AND RECEIVER FOR USE IN THE TRANSMISSION SYSTEM, AND RECORD CARRIER OBTAINED BY MEANS OF THE TRANSMITTER IN THE FORM OF A RECORDING DEVICE, now abandoned.)	Audio MPEG, Inc
5530655	6 June 1995	25 June 1996	1 June 1990	25 June 2013	Digital sub-band transmission system with transmission of an additional signal	U.S. patent 5,530,655 file+20: [2015, 6, 6] related_patent+20: [2010, 6, 1] grant+17: [2013, 6, 25] (Note: Case Text: This application is a continuation of application Ser. No. 08/190,807, filed Feb. 1, 1994, now abandoned, which is a continuation of co-pending U.S. patent application Ser. No. 08/173,850 filed Dec. 27, 1993, by Gerardus C. P. Lokhoff, Y. F. Dehery, and G. Stoll for SUBBAND CODED DIGITAL TRANSMISSION SYSTEM USING SOME COMPOSITE SIGNALS, which is a continuation of co-pending U.S. patent application Ser. No. 07/997,158 filed Dec. 21, 1992, now U.S. Pat. No. 5,323,396 issued Jun. 21, 1994, which is a continuation of application Ser. No. 07/532,462, filed on Jun. 1, 1990 by Gerardus C. P. Lokhoff for DIGITAL TRANSMISSION SYSTEM, TRANSMITTER AND RECEIVER FOR USE IN THE TRANSMISSION SYSTEM, AND RECORD CARRIER OBTAINED BY MEANS OF THE TRANSMITTER IN THE FORM OF A RECORDING DEVICE, now abandoned.)	Audio MPEG, Inc
5777992	7 June 1995	7 July 1998	1 June 1990	7 July 2015	Decoder for decoding and encoded digital signal and a receiver comprising the decoder	U.S. patent 5,777,992 file+20: [2015, 6, 7] related_patent+20: [2010, 6, 1] grant+17: [2015, 7, 7] (Note: Case Text: This application is a continuation of U.S. patent application Ser. No. 08/173,850 filed Dec. 27, 1993, now U.S. Pat. No. 5,606,618, which is a continuation of U.S. patent application Ser. No. 07/997,158 filed Dec. 21, 1992, now U.S. Pat. No. 5,323,396, which is a continuation of application Ser. No. 07/532,462 filed on Jun. 1, 1990 by Gerardus C. P. Lokhoff for DIGITAL TRANSMISSION SYSTEM, TRANSMITTER AND RECEIVER FOR USE IN THE TRANSMISSION SYSTEM, AND RECORD CARRIER OBTAINED BY MEANS OF THE TRANSMITTER IN THE FORM OF A RECORDING DEVICE, now abandoned.)	Audio MPEG, Inc
6289308	8 March 2000	11 September 2001	1 June 1990	1 June 2010	Encoded wideband digital transmission signal and record carrier recorded with such a signal	U.S. patent 6,289,308 file+20: [2020, 3, 8] related_patent+20: [2010, 6, 1] term extension 0 days (Note: Case Text: This application is a division of U.S. patent application Ser. No. 08/488,536 filed Jun. 7, 1995 now abandoned, which is a division of application Ser. No. 08/173,850 filed Dec. 27, 1993, now U.S. Pat. No. 5,606,618, which is a continuation of application Ser. No. 07/997,158 filed Dec. 21, 1992, now U.S. Pat. No. 5,323,396, which is a continuation of application Ser. No. 07/532,462 filed on Jun. 1, 1990 now abandoned, by Gerardus C. P. Lokhoff for DIGITAL TRANSMISSION SYSTEM, TRANSMITTER AND RECEIVER FOR USE IN THE TRANSMISSION SYSTEM, AND RECORD CARRIER OBTAINED BY MEANS OF THE TRANSMITTER IN THE FORM OF A RECORDING DEVICE, now abandoned.)	Audio MPEG, Inc
5481643	24 April 1995	2 January 1996	18 March 1993	18 March 2013	Transmitter, receiver and record carrier for transmitting/receiving at least a first and a second signal component	U.S. patent 5,481,643 file+20: [2015, 4, 24] related_patent+20: [2013, 3, 18] grant+17: [2013, 1, 2] (Note: Case Text: This is a continuation of application Ser. No. 08/180,004, filed Jan. 11, 1994 which is a continuation-in-part of application Ser. No. 08/032,915, filed Mar. 18, 1993, both now abandoned.)	Audio MPEG, Inc
5544247	25 October 1994	6 August 1996	25 October 1994	25 October 2014	Transmission and reception of a first and a second main signal component	U.S. patent 5,544,247 file+20: [2014, 10, 25] grant+17: [2013, 8, 6]	Audio MPEG, Inc
5610985	21 January 1994	11 March 1997	21 January 1994	11 March 2014	Digital 3-channel transmission of left and right stereo signals and a center signal	U.S. patent 5,610,985 file+20: [2014, 1, 21] grant+17: [2014, 3, 11]	Audio MPEG, Inc
5740317	30 August 1995	14 April 1998	21 July 1992	14 April 2015	Process for finding the overall monitoring threshold during a bit-rate-reducing source coding	U.S. patent 5,740,317 file+20: [2015, 8, 30] related_patent+20: [2013, 9, 17] pct_file+20: [2012, 7, 21] grant+17: [2015, 4, 14] (Note: Case Text: This application is a continuation of application Ser. No. 08/119,109, filed Sep. 17, 1993 (now abandoned).)	Audio MPEG, Inc
5878080	7 February 1997	2 March 1999	7 February 1997	7 February 2017	N-channel transmission, compatible with 2-channel transmission and 1-channel transmission	U.S. patent 5,878,080 file+20: [2017, 2, 7]	Audio MPEG, Inc
5960037	9 April 1997	28 September 1999	9 April 1997	9 April 2017	Encoding of a plurality of information signals	U.S. patent 5,960,037 file+20: [2017, 4, 9]	Audio MPEG, Inc
5991715	31 August 1995	23 November 1999	31 August 1995	31 August 2015	Perceptual audio signal subband coding using value classes for successive scale factor differences	U.S. patent 5,991,715 file+20: [2015, 8, 31] (Note: Case Text: This application is a Continuation of application Ser. No. 08/094,028, filed Jul. 26, 1993 (now abandoned), which is a 371 of PCT/EP91/01211 Jun. 6, 1991.)	Audio MPEG, Inc
6023490	9 April 1997	8 February 2000	9 April 1997	9 April 2017	Encoding apparatus for encoding a plurality of information signals	U.S. patent 6,023,490 file+20: [2017, 4, 9]	Audio MPEG, Inc
4821260	16 December 1987	11 April 1989	16 December 1987	16 December 2007	Transmission system	U.S. patent 4,821,260 file+20: [2007, 12, 16] grant+17: [2006, 4, 11]	Thomson
4942607	3 February 1988	17 July 1990	3 February 1988	3 February 2008	Method of transmitting an audio signal	U.S. patent 4,942,607 file+20: [2008, 2, 3] grant+17: [2007, 7, 17]	Thomson
5214742	1 October 1990	25 May 1993	26 January 1990	25 May 2010	Method for transmitting a signal	U.S. patent 5,214,742 file+20: [2010, 10, 1] pct_file+20: [2010, 1, 26] grant+17: [2010, 5, 25]	Thomson
5227990	17 January 1992	13 July 1993	17 January 1992	17 January 2012	Process for transmitting and receiving a signal	U.S. patent 5,227,990 file+20: [2012, 1, 17] grant+17: [2010, 7, 13]	Thomson
5384811	24 August 1992	24 January 1995	8 October 1990	24 January 2012	Method for the transmission of a signal	U.S. patent 5,384,811 file+20: [2012, 8, 24] pct_file+20: [2010, 10, 8] grant+17: [2012, 1, 24]	Thomson
5736943	31 May 1996	7 April 1998	8 July 1994	7 April 2015	Method for determining the type of coding to be selected for coding at least two signals	U.S. patent 5,736,943 file+20: [2016, 5, 31] pct_file+20: [2014, 7, 8] grant+17: [2015, 4, 7]	Thomson
5455833	26 April 1993	3 October 1995	25 October 1990	3 October 2012	Process for the detecting of errors in the transmission of frequency-coded digital signals	U.S. patent 5,455,833 file+20: [2013, 4, 26] pct_file+20: [2010, 10, 25] grant+17: [2012, 10, 3]	Thomson
5559834	15 April 1994	24 September 1996	6 October 1992	24 September 2013	Method of reducing crosstalk in processing of acoustic or optical signals	U.S. patent 5,559,834 file+20: [2014, 4, 15] pct_file+20: [2012, 10, 6] grant+17: [2013, 9, 24]	Thomson
5321729	26 April 1993	14 June 1994	24 June 1991	24 June 2011	Method for transmitting a signal	U.S. patent 5,321,729 file+20: [2013, 4, 26] related_patent+20: [2011, 6, 24] grant+17: [2011, 6, 14] (Note: Case Text: This is a continuation of application Ser. No. 07/718,402, filed Jun. 24, 1991, now abandoned.)	Thomson
5706309	2 May 1995	6 January 1998	2 November 1993	6 January 2015	Process for transmitting and/or storing digital signals of multiple channels	U.S. patent 5,706,309 file+20: [2015, 5, 2] pct_file+20: [2013, 11, 2] grant+17: [2015, 1, 6]	Thomson
5701346	12 September 1996	23 December 1997	2 February 1995	2 February 2015	Method of coding a plurality of audio signals	U.S. patent 5,701,346 file+20: [2016, 9, 12] pct_file+20: [2015, 2, 2] grant+17: [2014, 12, 23]	Thomson
5742735	25 August 1994	21 April 1998	20 April 1989	21 April 2015	Digital adaptive transformation coding method	U.S. patent 5,742,735 file+20: [2014, 8, 25] related_patent+20: [2009, 4, 20] grant+17: [2015, 4, 21] (Note: Case Text: This is a continuation of application Ser. No. 08/133,273 filed Oct. 7, 1993 now abandoned which is a continuation of Ser. No. 07/982,063 filed Nov. 25, 1992 now abandoned, which is a continuation of Ser. No. 07/716,769 filed Jun. 19, 1991 now abandoned, which is a continuation of Ser. No. 07/347,806, filed as PCT/DE88/00618, Oct. 6, 1988 published as WO89/03574, Apr. 20, 1989 now abandoned.)	Thomson
5812672	15 December 1994	22 September 1998	13 October 1992	22 September 2015	Method for reducing data in the transmission and/or storage of digital signals of several dependent channels	U.S. patent 5,812,672 file+20: [2014, 12, 15] pct_file+20: [2012, 10, 13] grant+17: [2015, 9, 22]	Thomson
5579430	26 January 1995	26 November 1996	23 December 1991	26 November 2013	Digital encoding process	U.S. patent 5,579,430 file+20: [2015, 1, 26] related_patent+20: [2011, 12, 32] grant+17: [2013, 11, 26] (Note: Case Text: This application is a continuation of application Ser. No. 08/169,768, filed on Dec. 20, 1993, now abandoned, which is a continuation of application Ser. No. 07/768,239, filed as PCT/DE90/00286 on Apr. 12, 1990, which is now abandoned.)	Thomson
6185539	26 May 1998	6 February 2001	19 February 1997	19 February 2017	Process of low sampling rate digital encoding of audio signals	U.S. patent 6,185,539 file+20: [2018, 5, 26] pct_file+20: [2017, 2, 19]	Thomson
6009399	16 April 1997	28 December 1999	16 April 1997	16 April 2017	Method and apparatus for encoding digital signals employing bit allocation using combinations of different threshold models to achieve desired bit rates	U.S. patent 6,009,399 file+20: [2017, 4, 16]	Thomson
5924060	20 March 1997	13 July 1999	14 January 1991	14 January 2011	Digital coding process for transmission or storage of acoustical signals by transforming of scanning values into spectral coefficients	U.S. patent 5,924,060 file+20: [2017, 3, 20] related_patent+20: [2011, 1, 14] (Note: Case Text: This application is a continuation of application Ser. No. 08/650,896, filed on May 17, 1996, (now abandoned) which was a continuation of application Ser. No. 08/519,620, filed on Sep. 25, 1995, (now abandoned) which was a continuation of application Ser. No. 07/977,748, filed on Nov. 16, 1992, (now abandoned), which was a continuation of application Ser. No. 07/816,528, filed on Dec. 30, 1991, (now abandoned), which was a continuation of application Ser. No. 07/640,550, filed on Jan. 14, 1991, (now abandoned), which was a continuation of application Ser. No. 07/177,550, filed on Apr. 4, 1991, (now abandoned) as international application serial No. PCT/DE87/00384, filed Aug. 29, 1987, claiming priority to foreign appl. No. P3629434.9, filed Aug. 29, 1986.)	Thomson
5703999	18 November 1996	30 December 1997	23 February 1995	18 November 2016	Process for reducing data in the transmission and/or storage of digital signals from several interdependent channels	U.S. patent 5,703,999 file+20: [2016, 11, 18] related_patent+20: [2015, 2, 32] (Note: Case Text: This application is a continuation of application Ser. No. 08/338,618, filed as PCT/DE93/00448 May 18, 1993.)	Thomson
