= Holographic direct sound printing =

3D printing using acoustic holograms

Holographic direct sound printing (HDSP) is a method of 3D printing which uses acoustic holograms, developed by researchers at Concordia University. Researchers claim that the printing process can be carried out 20 times faster and that it presents the advantages that an object can be created at once and several objects can be created at the same time. According to researchers, it can be used to print inside opaque surfaces, for example inside the human body, thus opening new opportunities in medicine. It is based on Direct Sound Printing method, introduced in 2022. A similar method, to print 3D objects using ultrasound holograms, based on acoustic trapping, was proposed by researchers at the Max Planck Institute for Medical Research and Heidelberg University, in February 2023.

== See also ==
- Acoustic tweezers
