= Acoustic levitation =

Suspension of objects using sound waves

Acoustic levitation is a method for suspending matter in air against gravity using acoustic radiation pressure from high intensity sound waves.

It works on the same principles as acoustic tweezers by harnessing acoustic radiation forces. However acoustic tweezers are generally small scale devices which operate in a fluid medium and are less affected by gravity, whereas acoustic levitation is primarily concerned with overcoming gravity. Technically speaking, dynamic acoustic levitation is a form of acoustophoresis, though this term is more commonly associated with small scale acoustic tweezers.

Typically, sound waves at ultrasonic frequencies are used thus creating no sound audible to humans. This is primarily due to the high intensity of sound required to counteract gravity. However, there have been cases of audible frequencies being used.

A Langevin horn-type standing wave acoustic levitator at the Argonne National Laboratory

There are various techniques for generating the sound, but the most common is the use of piezoelectric transducers which can efficiently generate high amplitude outputs at the desired frequencies.

Levitation is a promising method for containerless processing of microchips and other small, delicate objects in industry. Containerless processing may also be used for applications requiring very-high-purity materials or chemical reactions too rigorous to happen in a container. This method is harder to control than others such as electromagnetic levitation but has the advantage of being able to levitate nonconducting materials.

Although originally static, acoustic levitation has progressed from motionless levitation to dynamic control of hovering objects, an ability useful in the pharmaceutical and electronics industries. This dynamic control was first realised with a prototype with a chessboard-like array of square acoustic emitters that move an object from one square to another by slowly lowering the sound intensity emitted from one square while increasing the sound intensity from the other, allowing the object to travel virtually "downhill". More recently the development of phased array transducer boards have allowed more arbitrary dynamic control of multiple particles and droplets at once.

Recent advancements have also seen the price of the technology decrease significantly. The "TinyLev" is an acoustic levitator which can be constructed with widely available, low-cost off-the-shelf components, and a single 3D printed frame.

== History ==
=== Experimental ===
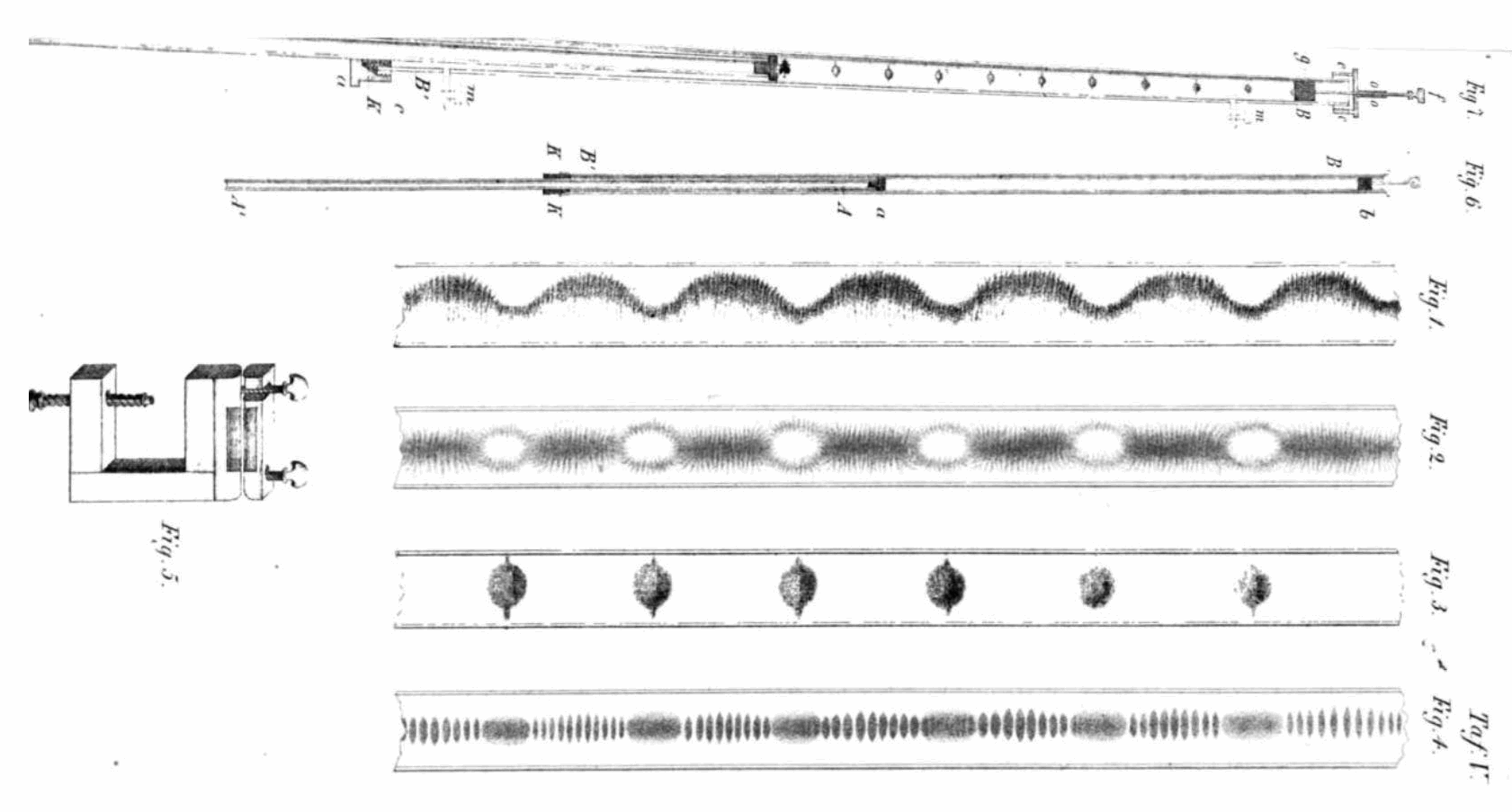
A drawing of the Kundt's tube experiment. The movement of the particles due to the acoustic radiation forces were the first demonstration of the possibility of acoustic levitation.

The first demonstration of the possibility of acoustic levitation was made in Kundt's Tube experiments in 1866. The experiment in a resonant chamber demonstrated that the particles could be gathered at the nodes of a standing wave by the acoustic radiation forces. However, the original experiment was conducted with the intention of calculating the wavelengths and therefore the speed of sound within a gas.

The first levitation was demonstrated by Bücks and Muller in 1933 who levitated alcohol droplets between a quartz crystal and a reflector. The next advance came from Hilary St Clair, who was interested in acoustic radiation forces primarily for their applications on the agglomeration of dust particles for use in mining applications. He created the first electromagnetic device for creating the excitation amplitudes necessary for levitation, then went on to levitate larger and heavier objects, including a coin.

Taylor Wang was the leader of a team which made significant use of acoustic radiation forces as a containment mechanism in zero gravity, taking a device up on the Space Shuttle Challenger mission STS-51-B to investigate the behaviour of levitated droplets in micro-gravity. Further experiments were conducted in 1992 aboard United States Microgravity Laboratory 1 (USML-1), and in 1995 aboard USML-2.

The most common levitator from at least the 1970s until 2017 was the Langevin Horn, consisting of a piezo-electric actuator, a metal transmitter and a reflector. However, this required precise tuning of the distance between the transmitter and the reflector as the distance between source and reflector needed to be an exact multiple of the wavelength. This is more difficult than it sounds as the wavelength varies with the speed of sound, which varies with environmental factors such as temperature and altitude. Significant studies have been made with such devices including into contactless chemistry and the levitation of small animals. A number of these were also combined to create continuous planar motion by reducing the sound intensity from one source whilst increasing that of the adjacent source, allowing the particle to travel "downhill" in the acoustic potential field.

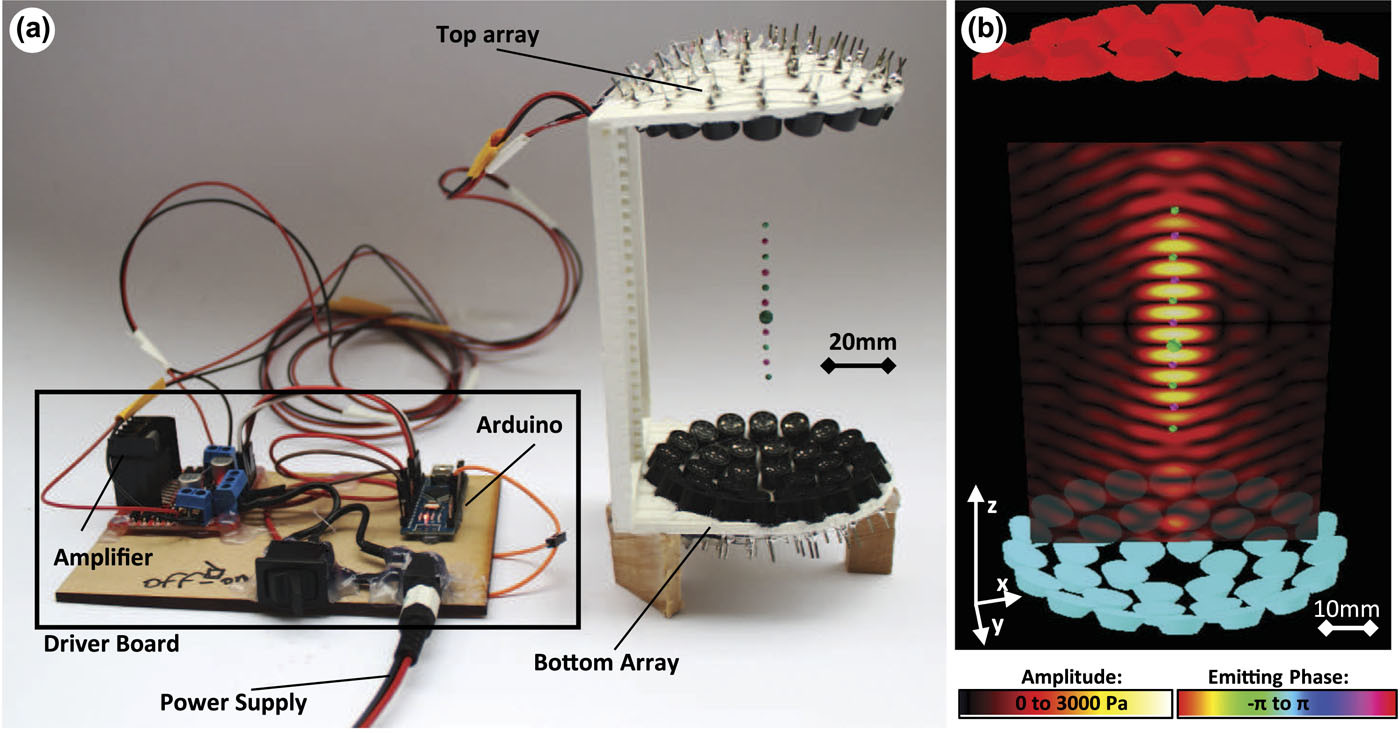
A TinyLev acoustic levitator including the electronics and a diagram of the peak pressure field.

A new generation of acoustic levitators employing a large number of small individual piezoelectric-transducers have recently become more common. The first of these levitators was the "TinyLev" device, a single-axis multi-emitter levitator invented by Asier Marzo, Adrian Barnes, and Bruce Drinkwater in 2017 at the University of Bristol. The key differences from the Langevin Horn were the use of sources from both top and bottom (rather than a source and a reflector) and the use of a large number of small transducers with parallel excitation, rather than a single piezoelectric element. The use of two opposing travelling waves, as opposed to a single source and a reflector, meant that levitation was still possible even when the distance between the top and bottom was not a precise multiple of the wavelength. The use of multiple small sources was initially designed as a cost saving measure, but also opened the door for phased array levitation, discussed below. The use of 3D printed components for the frame which positions and focuses the transducers and Arduinos as signal generators also significantly reduced the cost whilst increasing the accessibility, The reduction in cost was particularly important as a principal aim of this device was the democratisation of the technology.

This new approach also led to significant developments using Phased Array Ultrasonic Transducers (often referred to as PATs) for levitation. Phased Array Ultrasonic Transducers are a collection of ultrasonic speakers which are controlled to create a single desired sound field. This is achieved by controlling the relative phase (i.e. the delay time) between each output, and sometimes the relative output magnitudes. Unlike their counterparts in the non-destructive testing or imaging fields, these arrays will use a continuous output, as opposed to short bursts of energy. This has enabled single sided levitation as well as manipulation of large numbers of particles simultaneously.

Another approach which is growing in popularity is the use of 3D-printed components to apply the phase delays necessary for levitation, creating a similar effect to the PATs but with the advantage that they can have a higher spatial resolution than the phased array, allowing more complex fields to be formed. These are sometimes referred to as Acoustic Holograms, Metasurfaces, Delay lines or Metamaterials. The differences in terms are primarily based on the area from which the design technique originated, but the basic idea behind all techniques is essentially the same. They can also be used in conjunction with PATs to obtain dynamic reconfigurability and higher sound field resolution. Another advantage is the reduction in cost, with a prominent example being the low cost ultrasonic tractor beam for which an instructables was created.

Although many new techniques for manipulation have been developed, Langevin Horns are still used in research. They are often favoured for research into the dynamics of levitated objects due to the simplicity of their geometry and subsequent ease of simulation and control of experimental factors.

=== Theoretical ===
Lord Rayleigh developed theories about the pressure force associated with sound waves in the early 1900s, however this work was primarily based around the theoretical forces and energy contained within a sound wave. The first analysis of particles was conducted by L.V. King in 1934, who calculated the force on incompressible particles in an acoustic field. This was followed by Yosioka and Kawisama, who calculated the forces on compressible particles in plane acoustic waves. This was followed by Lev P. Gor'kov's work which generalised the field into the Gor'kov potential, the mathematical foundation for acoustic levitation which is still in widespread use today.

The Gor'kov potential is limited by its assumptions to spheres with a radius significantly less than the wavelength, the typical limit is considered to be one-tenth of the wavelength. Further analytical solutions are available for simple geometries however, to extend to larger or non-spherical objects it is common to use numerical methods, particularly the finite element method or the boundary element method. Radiation pressure of sound can also be controlled through sub-wavelength patterning of the surface of the object.

== Types of Levitation ==
Acoustic levitation can broadly be divided into five different categories:

1. Standing Wave Levitation: Particles are trapped at the nodes of a standing wave, formed by either a sound source and reflector (in the case of the Langevin Horn) or two sets of sources (in the case of the TinyLev). This relies upon the particles being small relative to the wavelength, typically in the region of 10% or less, and the maximum levitated weight is usually in the order of a few milligrams. It is also worth noting that if the particle is too small relative to the wavelength then it will behave differently and travel to the anti-nodes. Typically these levitators are single-axis, meaning that all particles are trapped along a single, central axis of the levitator. However, with the use of PATs they can also be dynamic. This is the strongest technique for levitation at a distance greater than a wavelength due to the constructive interference from the two travelling waves which form it. The forces from single beam levitation at a distance are 30 times weaker than a simple standing wave.
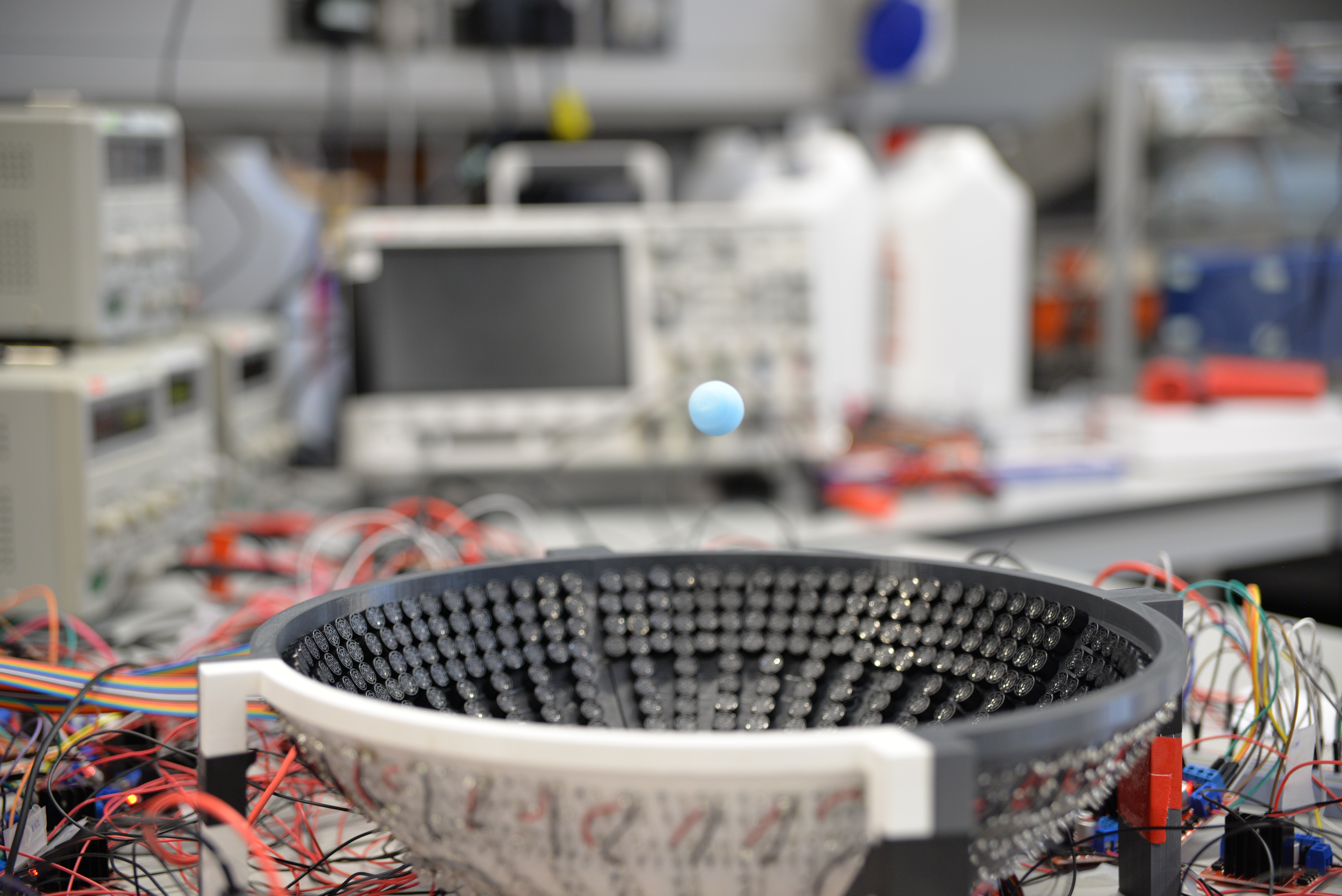
  A single beam acoustic levitator using a vortex trap to levitate an expanded polystyrene particle approximately twice the size of the wavelength. The vortices are alternated rapidly in direction to avoid spinning the particle to the point of instability. Here 450 transducers at 40kHz are used.
2. Far Field Acoustic Levitation: Larger than wavelength objects are levitated by generating a field which is tailored to the levitated object's size and shape. This allows objects larger than the wavelength to be levitated at distances greater than the wavelength from the source. However, the object must not be high density. In early approaches this was a simple vertical standing wave for disks or a three transducer arrangement to stabilise a sphere. However, recent developments have used a PAT and the boundary element method to levitate much larger objects at much longer distances. The heaviest object lifted by this technique is a 30mm diameter expanded polystyrene sphere of mass 0.6g. An expanded polystyrene octahedron with a diagonal length of 50mm and mass 0.5g is the largest object ever acoustically levitated by this technique using PATs above and below the object.
3. Single Beam Levitation: Levitation of objects at a distance greater than a single wavelength from the sources with access only from a single side. In this case the trap must be specially designed, and usually takes the form of a twin trap or a vortex trap, although a third trap type called a bottle trap is also possible. The twin trap is the simplest of these possibilities which forms two high pressure "tweezers" on either side of the particle. If geometric focusing is used then this can be used to build a tractor beam with commonly available parts. The vortex trap creates a "hole" of low pressure in the centre. It requires a more complex phase field but, unlike the twin trap, can be used to lift larger than wavelength objects. In 2019 the largest object ever lifted by a tractor beam was done so at the University of Bristol and shown on "The Edge of Science", a BBC Earth production for YouTube Originals by presenter Rick Edwards. It was a 19.53mm diameter expanded polystyrene ball.
4. Near Field Levitation: A large, planar object is placed very close to the transducer surface and acts as a reflector, allowing it to levitate on a very thin film of air. This technique is capable of lifting several kilograms, but cannot go higher than hundreds of micrometers above the surface. As such on a human scale it appears more as a huge reduction in friction, rather than as levitation.
5. Inverted Near Field Acoustic Levitation: Under certain conditions the repulsive force which produces near field levitation inverts and become an attractive force. In this case the transducer can be pointed downwards and the set up will levitate the object will be levitated below it. The object will be levitated at a distance of tens of micrometers and objects in the milligram scale have been levitated. Current research suggests it occurs where the equivalent radius of the disk is less than 38% of the wavelength

These broad classifications are a single way of sorting the types of levitation, but they are not definitive. Further work is being conducted on combining techniques to obtain greater abilities, such as the stable levitation of non axis-symmetric objects by combining standing wave levitation with a twin-trap (typically a single beam levitation technique). There is also a significant amount of work into combining these techniques with 3D printed phase shifting components for advantages such as passive field forming or higher spatial resolution. There is also significant variation in the control techniques. Whilst PATs are common it has also been shown that Chladni Plates can be used as a single standing wave source to manipulate levitated objects by changing the frequency.

== Applications ==
The main applications of acoustic levitation are likely to be scientific and industrial.

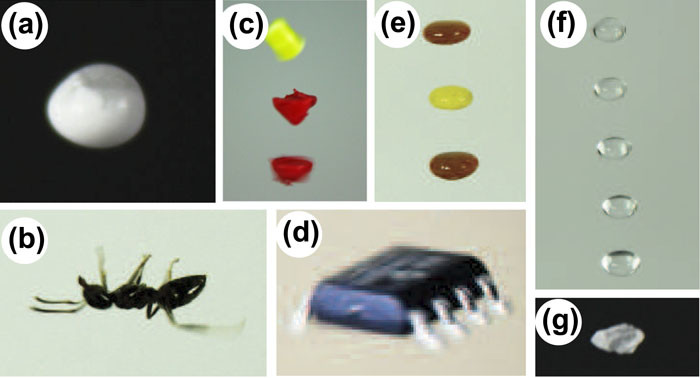
A selection of acoustically Levitated Objects in a TinyLev including solids, liquids, an ant and an electrical component. All in the size range of 2 mm-6 mm.

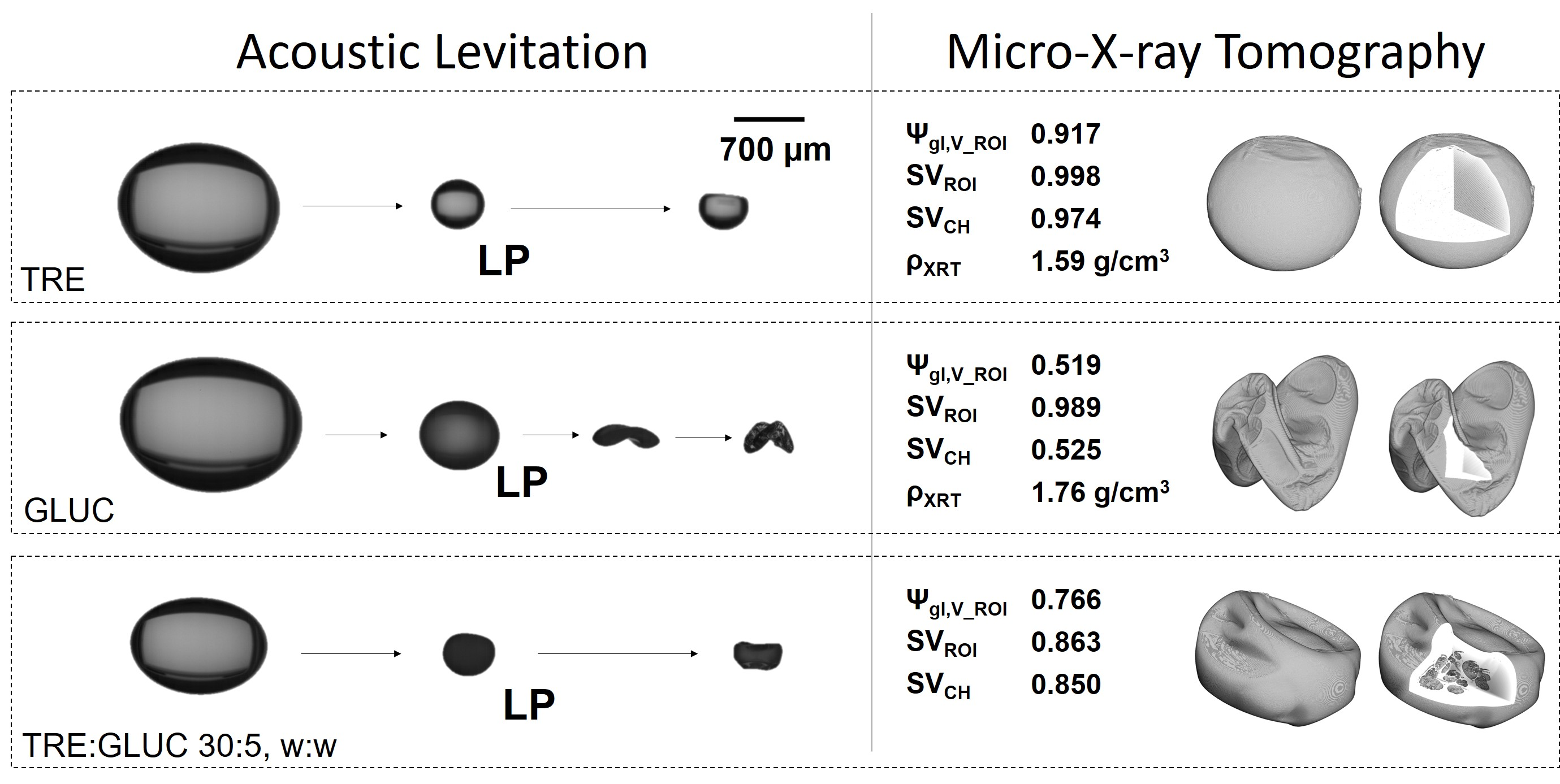
(Left) Images of acoustically levitated droplets during liquid evaporation and particle formation. (Right) X-ray microtomography gives insights into the final particle 3D structure.

Acoustic levitation provides a container-less environment for droplet drying experiments to study liquid evaporation and particle formation. The contactless manipulation of droplets has also gained significant interest as it promises small scale contactless chemistry There is particular interest in the mixing of multiple droplets using PATs so that chemical reactions can be studied in isolation from containers. There is also interest in using a small levitated droplet as container of protein crystals for X-ray diffraction experiments to determine the crystal structure at atomic resolution at room temperature at high throughput.

The levitation of small living animals has also been studied, and the vitality of animals which typically exist in air was not affected. In the future it could be used as a tool to study the animals themselves.

There is active research in the field of contactless assembly. The levitation of surface mount electrical components has been demonstrated as has micro-assembly with a combination of acoustic and magnetic fields. There is also commercial interest in 3D printing whilst levitated, with Boeing filing a patent on the concept.

Acoustic levitation has also been proposed as a technique for creating a volumetric display, with light projected onto a particle, which moves along the path to create the image faster than the eye can process. This has already proved possible and has been brought together with audio and haptic feedback from the same PAT.

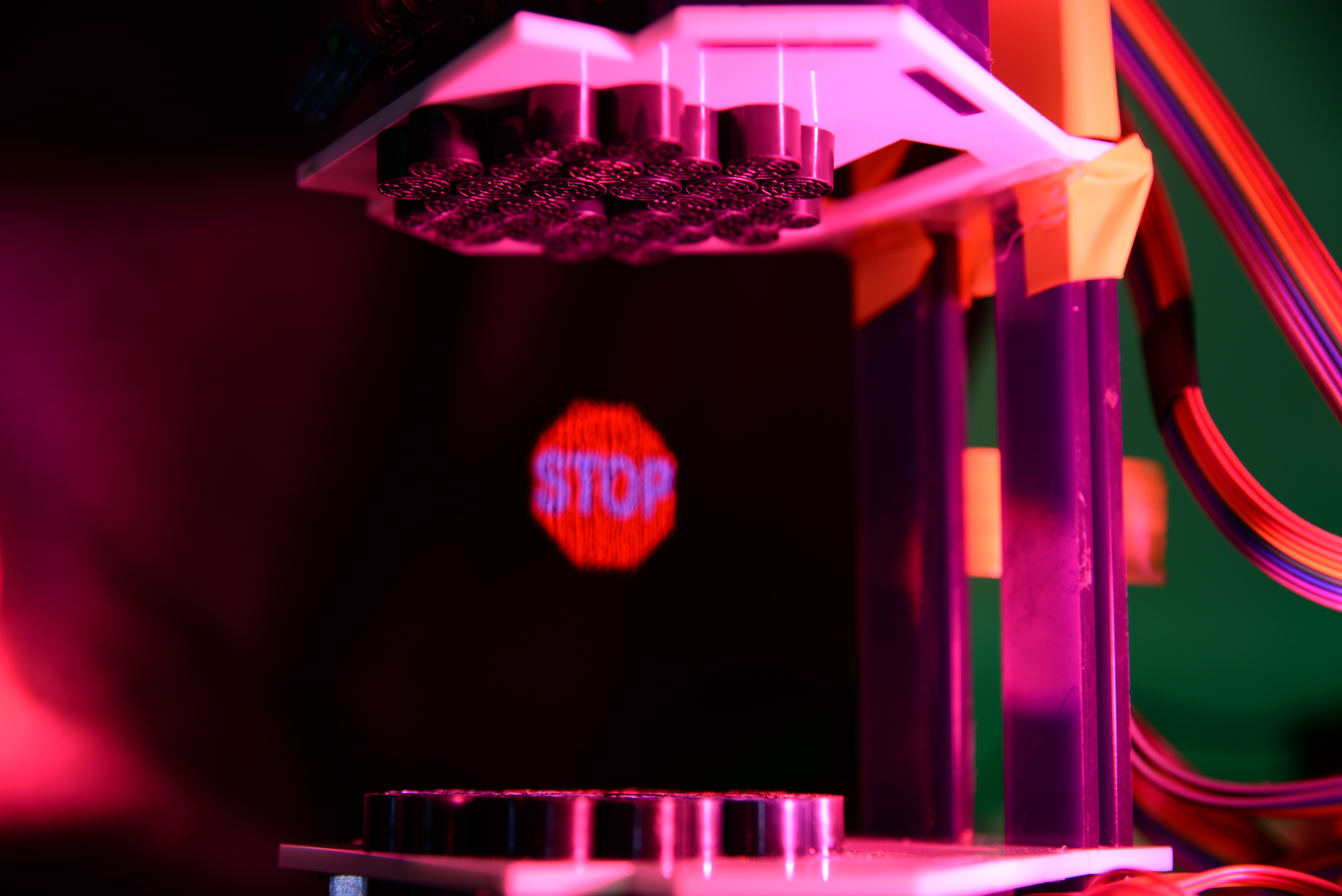
An acoustophoretic volumetric display where a small expanded polystyrene particle is rapidly moved with light projected onto it to produce the image of a 'stop sign'. This is a composite image taken over 20 seconds.

== See also ==
- Acoustic tweezers
- Optical levitation
- Radiation pressure
- Electrostatic levitation
- Magnetic levitation
- Aerodynamic levitation
- Buoyancy
