= Acoustic contrast factor =

In acoustics, the acoustic contrast factor is a number that describes the relationship between the densities and the sound velocities of two media, or equivalently (because of the form of the expression), the relationship between the densities and compressibilities of two media.

It is most often used in the context of biomedical ultrasonic imaging techniques using acoustic contrast agents and in the field of ultrasonic manipulation of particles (acoustophoresis) much smaller than the wavelength using ultrasonic standing waves. In the latter context, the acoustic contrast factor is the number which, depending on its sign, tells whether a given type of particle in a given medium will be attracted to the pressure nodes or anti-nodes.

== Example - particle in a medium ==
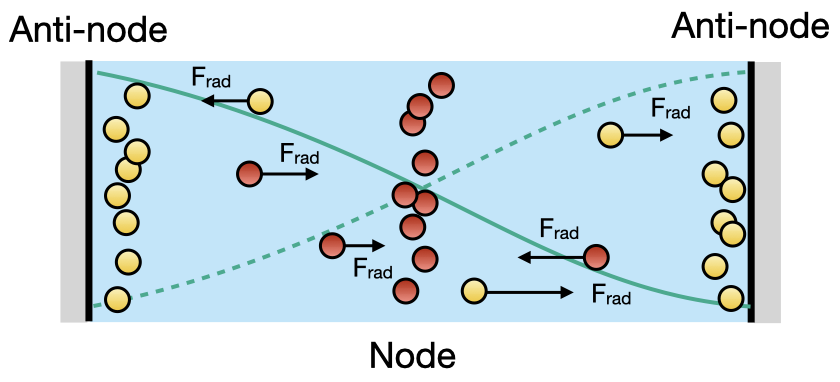
The figure shows the cross-section of a straight, hard-walled (grey), water-filled channel (blue) with a one-dimensional standing ultrasonic half-wavelength pressure resonance (green curve). F_{rad} is the radiation force on a small suspended particle. Particles that have a positive (red) contrast factor in water are moved to the pressure nodes, while particles with a negative (yellow) contrast factor in water are moved to the anti-pressure nodes.

In an ultrasonic standing wave field, a small spherical particle ($a \ll \lambda$, where $a$ is the particle radius, and $\lambda$ is the wavelength) suspended in an inviscid fluid will move under the effect of an acoustic radiation force. The direction of its movement is governed by the physical properties of the particle and the surrounding medium, expressed in the form of an acoustophoretic contrast factor $\phi$.

Given the compressibilities $\beta_m$ and $\beta_p$ and densities $\rho_m$ and $\rho_p$ of the medium and particle, respectively, the acoustic contrast factor $\phi$ can be expressed as:

$$\phi = {\frac{5\rho_p-2\rho_m}{2\rho_p+\rho_m}}-{\frac{\beta_p}{\beta_m}}$$

For a positive value of $\phi$, the particles will be attracted to the pressure nodes.

For a negative value of $\phi$, the particles will be attracted to the pressure anti-nodes.

== See also ==
- Acoustic impedance
- Acoustic tweezers
