= Acoustic radiation force =

Psychical phenomenon from acoustic waves

Acoustic radiation force (ARF) is a physical phenomenon resulting from the interaction of an acoustic wave with an obstacle placed along its path. Generally, the force exerted on the obstacle is evaluated by integrating the acoustic radiation pressure (due to the presence of the sonic wave) over its time-varying surface.

The magnitude of the force exerted by an acoustic plane wave at any given location can be calculated as:

$$|F^{\rm rad}| = \frac{2 \alpha I}{c}$$

where

- $|F^{\rm rad}|$ is a force per unit volume, here expressed in kg/(s^{2}cm^{2});
- $\alpha$ is the absorption coefficient in Np/cm (nepers per cm);
- $I$ is the temporal average intensity of the acoustic wave at the given location in W/cm^{2}; and
- $c$ is the speed of sound in the medium in cm/s.

The effect of frequency on acoustic radiation force is taken into account via intensity (higher pressures are more difficult to attain at higher frequencies) and absorption (higher frequencies have a higher absorption rate). As a reference, water has an acoustic absorption of 0.002 dB/(MHz^{2}cm).^{(page number?)} Acoustic radiation forces on compressible particles such as bubbles are also known as Bjerknes forces, and are generated through a different mechanism, which does not require sound absorption or reflection. Acoustic radiation forces can also be controlled through sub-wavelength patterning of the surface of the object.

When a particle is exposed to an acoustic standing wave it will experience a time-averaged force known as the primary acoustic radiation force ($F_{pr}$)_{.} In a rectangular microfluidic channel with coplanar walls which acts as a resonance chamber, the incoming acoustic wave can be approximated as a resonant, standing pressure wave of the form:

$p_1 = p_a\cos{kz}$.

where $k$ is the wave number. For a compressible, spherical and micrometre-sized particle (of radius $a$) suspended in an inviscid fluid in a rectangular micro-channel with a 1D planar standing ultrasonic wave of wavelength $\lambda$, the expression for the primary radiation force (at the far-field region where $a \ll \lambda$）becomes then:

$F^{\rm 1D}_{pr}= 4\pi\Phi(\tilde{\kappa},\tilde{\rho})a^3kE_{ac}\sin{2kz}$

$\Phi(\tilde{\kappa},\tilde{\rho})={1 \over 3} \left [ {5\tilde{\rho}-2 \over 2\tilde{\rho}+1}-\tilde{\kappa} \right ]$

$E_{\rm ac}={1 \over 4}\kappa_fp^2_a={p^2_a \over 4\rho_fc^2_f}$

where

- $\Phi$ is the acoustic contrast factor
- $\tilde{\kappa}$ is relative compressibility between the particle $\kappa_p$ and the surrounding fluid $\kappa_f$: $\tilde{\kappa}=\kappa_p / \kappa_f$
- $\tilde{\rho}$ is relative density between the particle $\rho_p$ and the surrounding fluid $\rho_f$: $\tilde{\rho}=\rho_p / \rho_f$
- $E_{\rm ac}$ is the acoustic energy density
- The factor $\sin{2kz}$ makes the radiation force period doubled and phase shifted relative to the pressure wave $p_a\cos{kz}$
- $c_f$ is the speed of sound in the fluid

== See also ==
- Acoustic tweezers
- Radiation pressure
