= Electrostatic levitation =

Process of levitating a charged object using electric fields

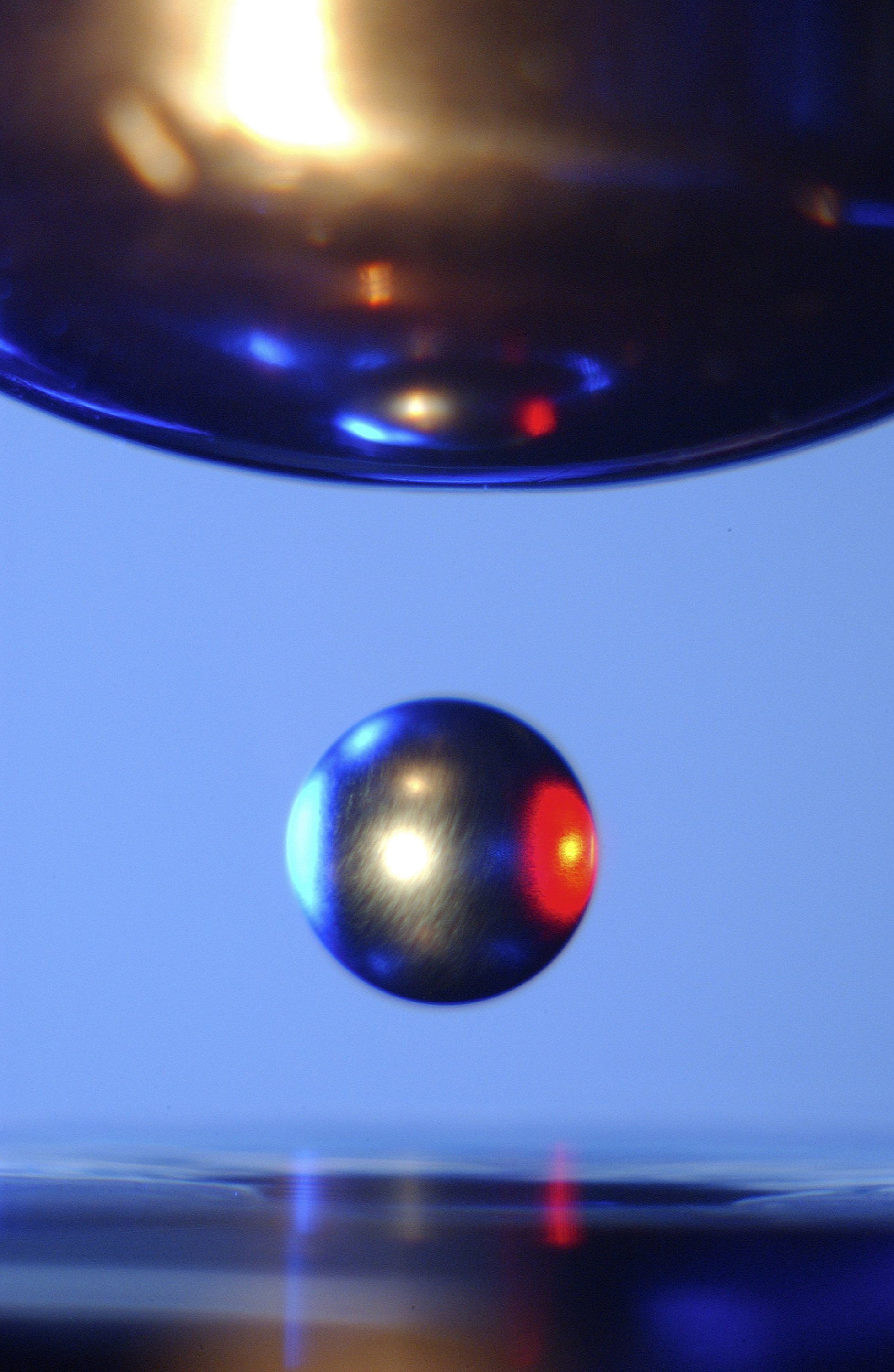
Sample of a titanium-zirconium-nickel alloy inside the Electrostatic Levitator vacuum chamber at NASA's Marshall Space Flight Center.

Electrostatic levitation, electrostatic suspension, or static levitation is the process of using an electric field to levitate a charged object and counteract gravity. Here, the electric force is the main force that counteracts gravity and other effects to enable successful suspension. As seen with magnetic levitation, there are two main things to achieve for successful levitation: (a) the electrostatic force being sufficient to overpower gravity and (b) acceptable stability.

It was used, for instance, in Robert Millikan's oil drop experiment and was used to suspend the gyroscopes in Gravity Probe B during launch.

Because of Earnshaw's theorem, no static arrangement of classical electrostatic fields can stably levitate a point charge. There is an equilibrium point where the two fields cancel, but it is an unstable equilibrium. By using numerous feedback techniques it is possible to adjust the charges to achieve a quasi static levitation.

== Lifting mechanisms ==
Electrostatic charges and objects can attract or repel one another depending on the polarities: like charges repel, and unlike charges attract. An example would be two spherical electrodes, one bigger than the other, with the bigger one bolted to the ground without a conductive means to discharge the charges. The two electrodes have a negative charge, and because the smaller electrode is free to move on the floor, once it is placed near the bigger electrode, it experiences an electrostatic repulsion force. Thus, if the movable electrode is placed on top, the object must be charged to experience the Coulomb force, and that force must be strong enough, or the object must be light enough, to be suspended.

== Stability ==
The idea of particle instability in an electrostatic field originated with Samuel Earnshaw in 1839 and was formalized by James Clerk Maxwell in 1874 who gave it the title "Earnshaw's theorem" and proved it with the Laplace equation. Earnshaw's theorem explains why a system of electrons is not stable and was invoked by Niels Bohr in his atom model of 1913 when criticizing J. J. Thomson's atom.

Earnshaw's theorem holds that a charged particle suspended in an electrostatic field is unstable, because the forces of attraction and repulsion vary at an equal rate that is proportional to the inverse square law and remain in balance wherever a particle moves. Since the forces remain in balance, there is no inequality to provide a restoring force; and the particle remains unstable and can freely move without restriction.

== Methods of levitation ==
Many methods can achieve electrostatic levitation, as long as the electric field is strong enough to overcome gravity, including active feedback methods for more stable suspension. Furthermore, the stronger the electric field, the heavier and larger objects it can suspend, and the more strongly other electrical phenomena will be amplified. At sufficiently high voltages, suspended objects without points or edges generate an electric field strong enough to form corona discharges on the bottom and top, which are more visible under dark conditions, where a bluish, violet, or magenta glow, by similar mechanisms seen with the gas discharge lamp, will be visible along with screeching noises and the smell of ozone. Conductors form corona discharges better than insulators, though the corona may contribute to charge leakage.

Drawing from his article "Overcoming Gravitation." Sir Piggott used his electrostatic apparatus for space telegraphy and electrostatic levitation, using beads about 11 mm in diameter covered in corona discharges.

=== Same-charges ===
The most common way is to have two objects with the same charge. Achieving this is straightforward. If you have a fixed object on the bottom with a negative charge and a lightweight, thin plastic object with a negative charge, and you let go of the plastic on top, the electrostatic repulsion grows as it gets closer and closer until it floats above it. This can be seen with lunar dust forming "moon mountains" or atmospheric pockets of dust, where solar radiation knocks electrons off, leaving the dust positively charged and repelled from the ground.

=== Two electrodes ===
Another method uses two electrodes with opposing charges: one positive and one negative. Suppose you place a small copper bead placed on the bottom electrode (the electrodes are not energized yet) or in the middle. The top electrode has a positive charge, and the bottom electrode has a negative charge. Once an external source, such as an electrostatic generator or power supply, powers the electrodes, the copper bead experiences charge separation by induction, with negative charges on top and positive charges on the bottom.

=== One electrode ===
The third method uses only one electrode. The difference between this method and the same-charge method (which technically uses a fixed bottom electrode) is that the electrode is placed at the top and does not rely on repulsive forces for levitation. Suppose a top electrode has a positive charge and a copper bead placed near it; when released or brought near, the copper bead experiences electrostatic induction, with negative charges on the top and positive charges on the bottom.

== Uses cases ==
Electrostatic levitation has been used for numerous applications, such as demonstrating electrostatics (with friction rods or electrostatic generators such as the Van de Graaff), toys and gimmicks commonly called the "Fun Fly Stick," and studying certain objects and substances, such as those with high-purity thermophysical properties.

Dr. Won-Kyu Rhim invented the first known electrostatic levitator at NASA's Jet Propulsion Laboratory in 1993 for high-temperature containerless materials processing. A charged sample 2 mm in diameter can be levitated in a vacuum chamber between two vertically positioned electrodes. A feedback system controls the field to keep the levitated sample at a predetermined position. JAXA and NASA have built numerous copies of the system, with the original transferred to California Institute of Technology (Caltech) with an upgraded setup of tetrahedra four beam laser heating system.

== See also ==
- Magnetic levitation
- Optical levitation
- Acoustic levitation
- Aerodynamic levitation
- Biefeld-Brown effect
- Ionocraft (Lifter)
- Van de Graff generator
