= Aerodynamic levitation =

Suspension of objects using gas pressure

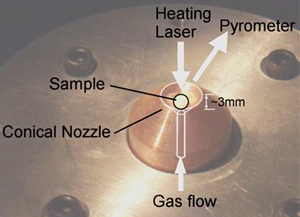
Aerodynamic levitation apparatus: a spherical sample is floated on a gas stream which flows through the conical nozzle. Sample is heated by a CO_{2} laser and temperature is measured from sample brightness by a pyrometer.

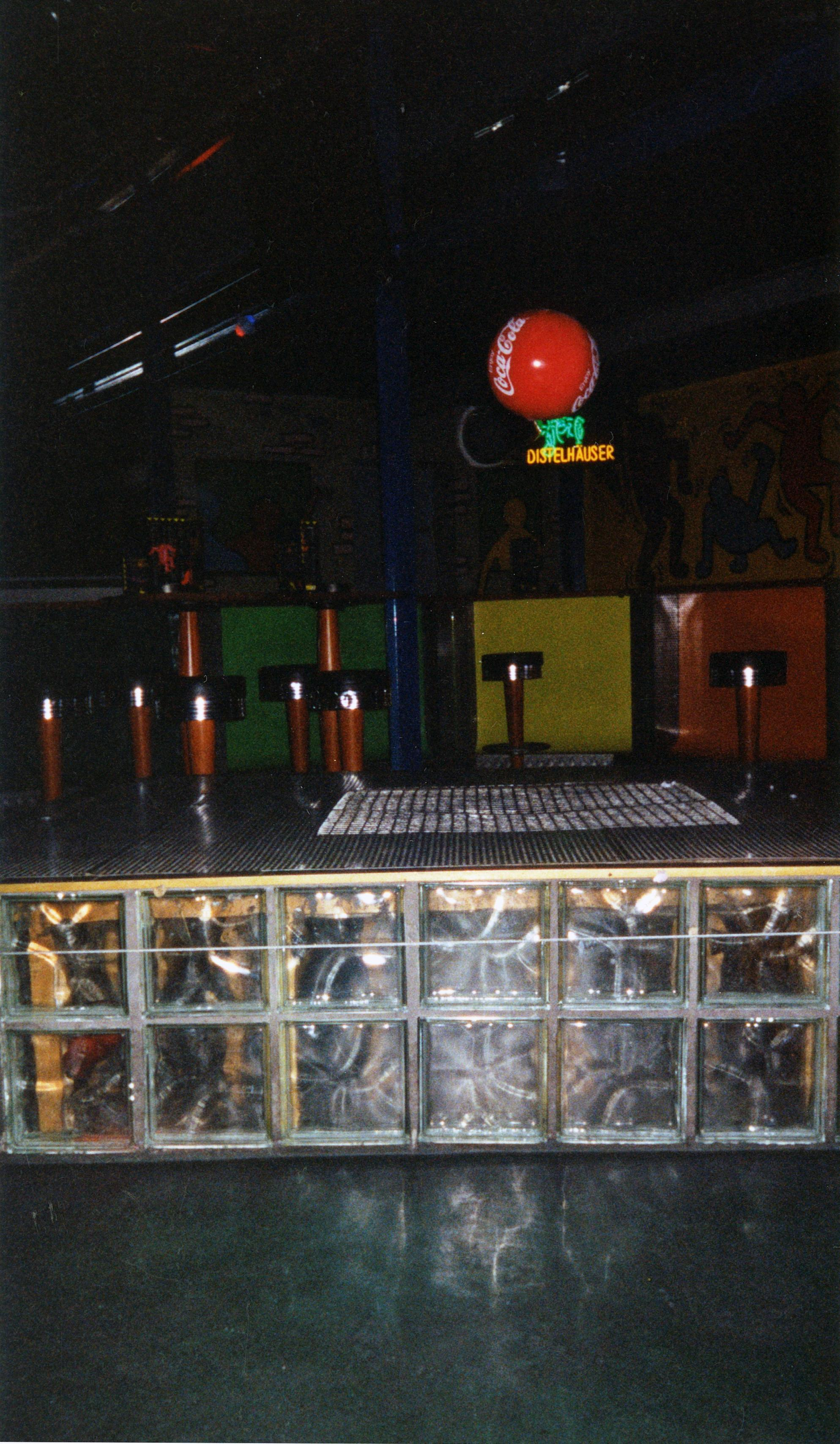
Here a light ball hovers in an air stream generated by a ventilator in the square box.

Aerodynamic levitation is the use of gas pressure to levitate materials so that they are no longer in physical contact with any container. In scientific experiments this removes contamination and nucleation issues associated with physical contact with a container.

== Overview ==
The term aerodynamic levitation could be applied to many objects that use gas pressure to counter the force of gravity, and allow stable levitation. Helicopters and air hockey pucks are two good examples of objects that are aerodynamically levitated. However, more recently this term has also been associated with a scientific technique which uses a cone-shaped nozzle allowing stable levitation of 1-3mm diameter spherical samples without the need for active control mechanisms.

== Aerodynamic levitation as a scientific tool ==
These systems allow spherical samples to be levitated by passing gas up through a diverging conical nozzle. Combining this with >200W continuous CO_{2} laser heating allows sample temperatures in excess of 3000 degrees Celsius to be achieved.

When heating materials to these extremely high temperatures levitation in general provides two key advantages over traditional furnaces. First, contamination that would otherwise occur from a solid container is eliminated. Second, the sample can be undercooled, i.e. cooled below its normal freezing temperature without actually freezing.

=== Undercooling of liquid samples ===
Undercooling, or supercooling, is the cooling of a liquid below its equilibrium freezing temperature while it remains a liquid. This can occur wherever crystal nucleation is suppressed. In levitated samples, heterogeneous nucleation is suppressed due to lack of contact with a solid surface. Levitation techniques typically allow samples to be cooled several hundred degrees Celsius below their equilibrium freezing temperatures.

=== Glass produced by aerodynamic levitation ===
Since crystal nucleation is suppressed by levitation, and since it is not limited by sample conductivity (unlike electromagnetic levitation), aerodynamic levitation can be used to make glassy materials, from high temperature melts that cannot be made by standard methods. Several silica-free, aluminium oxide based glasses have been made.

=== Physical property measurements ===
In the last few years a range of in situ measurement techniques have also been developed. The following measurements can be made with varying precision:

electrical conductivity, viscosity, density, surface tension, specific heat capacity,

In situ aerodynamic levitation has also been combined with:

X-ray synchrotron radiation, neutron scattering, NMR spectroscopy

== See also ==
- Magnetic levitation
- Electrostatic levitation
- Optical levitation
- Acoustic levitation
- Coandă effect
