= Acoustic radiation pressure =

Net pressure exerted on a surface or interface by an acoustic wave

Acoustic radiation pressure is the apparent pressure difference between the average pressure at a surface moving with the displacement of the wave propagation (the Lagrangian pressure) and the pressure that would have existed in the fluid of the same mean density when at rest. Numerous authors make a distinction between the phenomena of Rayleigh radiation pressure and Langevin radiation pressure.

== See also ==
- Radiation pressure
- Acoustic levitation
- Acoustic radiation force
