= Bjerknes force =

Translational forces on bubbles in a sound wave

Bjerknes forces are translational forces on bubbles in a sound wave. The phenomenon is a type of acoustic radiation force. Primary Bjerknes forces are caused by an external sound field; secondary Bjerknes forces are attractive or repulsive forces between pairs of bubbles in the same sound field caused by the pressure field generated by each bubble volume's oscillations. They were first described by Vilhelm Bjerknes in his 1906 Fields of Force.

== Hydrodynamics – electromagnetism analogy ==
In Fields of Force Bjerknes lay out geometrical and dynamical analogies between the Maxwell's theory of electromagnetism and hydrodynamics. In the light of these analogies the Bjerknes forces are being predicted.

=== Principle of kinematic buoyancy ===
Bjerknes writes:

"Any body which participates in the translatory motion of a fluid mass is subject to a kinematic buoyancy equal to the product of the acceleration of the translatory motion multiplied by the mass of the water displaced by the body"

This principle is analogous to Archimedes' principle. Based on this principle the force acting on a particle of volume $V$ is $F = \bold{a} \rho V =\frac{\partial \bold{u}}{\partial t} \rho V$. Where $\bold{u}$ is the fluid velocity and $\rho$ is the fluid density.

Using conservation of momentum for incompressible non-viscous fluid one can find that to first order: $\rho \frac{\partial \bold{u}}{\partial t}=-\nabla P$, Concluding that $F = - V \nabla P$.

=== Charge and oscillating particles ===
Bjerknes realized that the velocity field generated by an expanding particle in an incompressible fluid has the same geometrical structure as the electric field generated by a positively charged particle, and that the same applies for contracting particle and a negatively charged particle.

In the case of an oscillating motion, Bjerknes argued that two particles that oscillate in phase generate a velocity field that is geometrically equivalent to the electric field generated by two particles with the same charge, whereas two particles that oscillate in an opposite phase will generate a velocity field that is geometrically equivalent to the electric field generated by particles with an opposite sign.

Bjerknes then writes:

"Between Bodies pulsating in the same phase there is an apparent attraction; between bodies pulsating in the opposite phase there is an apparent repulsion, the force being proportional to the product of the two intensities of pulsating, and proportional to the inverse square of the distance."

This result is counter to our intuition, as it demonstrates that bodies oscillating in phase exert an attractive force on each other, despite creating a field akin to that of identically charged particles. This result was described by Bjerknes as "Astonishing".

== Primary Bjerknes force ==
The force on a small particle in a sound wave is given by:

$$F = - V \nabla P$$

where V is the volume of the particle, and $\nabla$P is the acoustic pressure gradient on the bubble.

Assuming a sinusoidal standing wave, the time-averaged pressure gradient over a single acoustic cycle is zero, meaning a solid particle (with fixed volume) experiences no net force. However, because a bubble is compressible, the oscillating pressure field also causes its volume to change; for spherical bubbles this can be described by the Rayleigh–Plesset equation. This means the time-averaged product of the bubble volume and the pressure gradient can be non-zero over an acoustic cycle. Unlike acoustic radiation forces on incompressible particles, net forces can be generated in the absence of attenuation or reflection of the sound wave.

The sign of the force will depend on the relative phase between the pressure field $P(t)$ and the volume $V(t)$ oscillations. According to the theory of forced harmonic oscillator the relative phase will depend on the difference between the bubble resonant frequency and the acoustic driving frequency.

=== Bubble focusing ===
From Rayleigh–Plesset equation one can derive the bubble resonant frequency:

$\omega_0^2 = \frac{1}{\rho R_0^2} \Bigl( 3\kappa \bigl(P_0 - P_V \bigr) + 2(3\kappa - 1) \frac{\sigma}{R_0} \Bigr)$

Where $\rho$ is the fluid density, $R_0$ is the rest radius of the bubble, $\kappa$ is the polytropic index, $P_0$ is the ambient pressure, $P_V$ is the vapor pressure and $\sigma$ is the surface tension constant.

Bubbles with resonance frequency above the acoustic driving frequency travel up the pressure gradient, while those with a lower resonance frequency travel down the pressure gradient.

The dependence of the resonant frequency ($\omega_0$) on the rest radius of the bubble predicts that for standing waves, there is a critical radius $R_c$ that depends on the driving frequency. Small bubbles ($R_0<R_c$) accumulate at pressure antinodes, whereas large bubbles ($R_0>R_c$) accumulate at pressure nodes.
