= Atomic force acoustic microscopy =

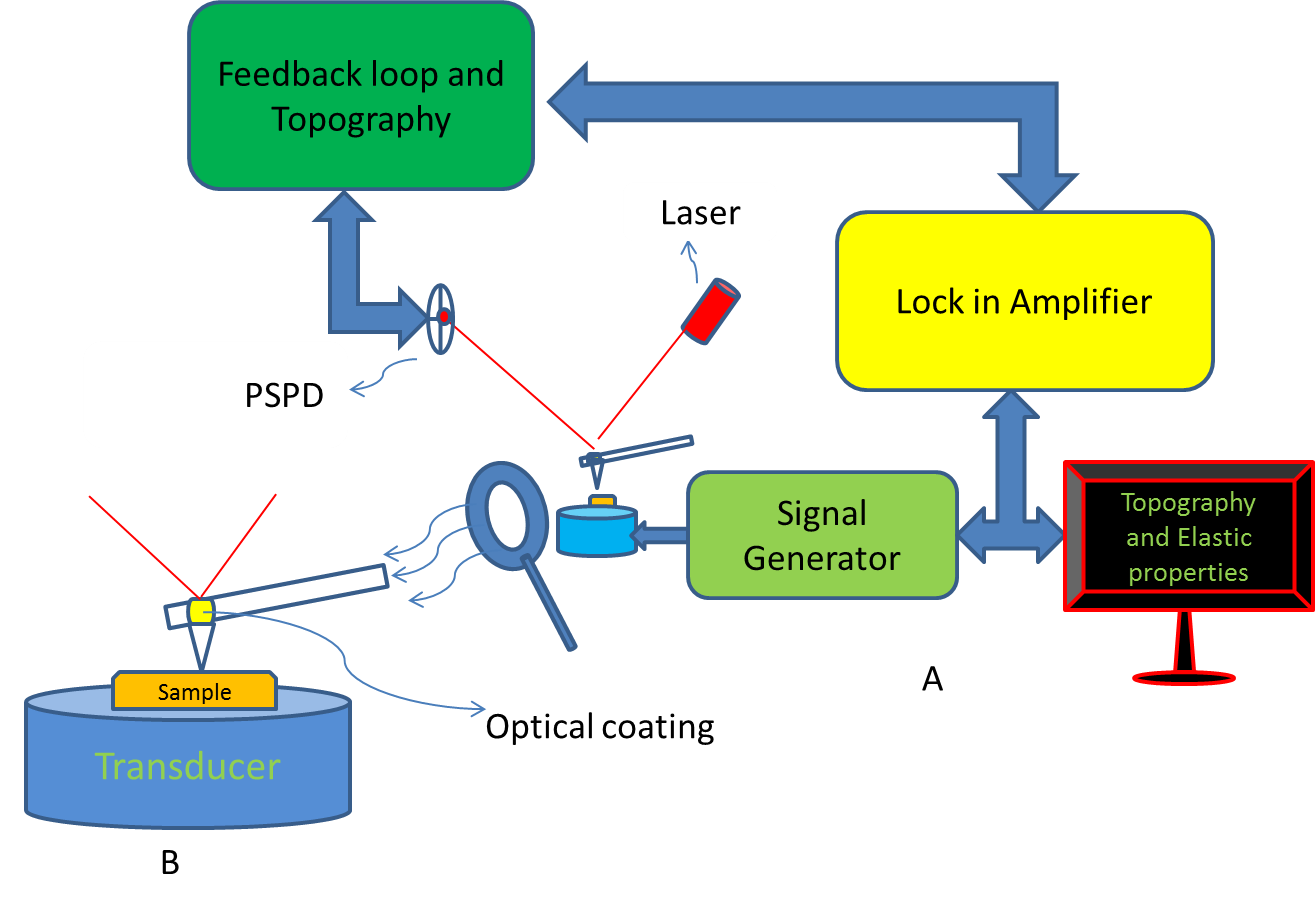
AFAM

Atomic force acoustic microscopy (AFAM) is a type of scanning probe microscopy (SPM). It is a combination of acoustic microscopy and atomic force microscopy. The principal difference between AFAM and other forms of SPM is the addition of a transducer at the bottom of the sample which induces longitudinal out-of-plane vibrations in the specimen. These vibrations are sensed by a cantilever and tip called a probe. The figure shown here is the clear schematic of AFAM principle here B is the magnified version of the tip and sample placed on the transducer and tip having some optical coating generally gold coating to reflect the laser light on to the photodiode.

Any type of material can be measured with this microscope. In particular, nano-scale properties such as elastic modulus, shear modulus and Poisson ratio can be measured.

The frequency used sweeps from some few kHz to MHz, keeping the sine wave amplitude constant. The sine longitudinal waves are sensed by the probe, and the deflection of the probe is detected by laser light focused on to a position sensitive photodiode (PSPD). This deflection of the reflected laser beam from the cantilever (probe) indicates the flexural and torsional parameters of the specimen. The high-frequency signal is sent to a lock-in amplifier and correlated with the reference signal sent by the signal generator to form the AFAM image.

Since the development of atomic force microscopy many modes and related techniques have emerged. Ultrasonic force microscopy, ultrasonic atomic force microscopy, scanning acoustic force microscopy and AFAM all come under the branch of near-field microscopy techniques called contact resonance force microscopy (CRFM). CRFM techniques depend principally on the calculation of contact resonance frequencies and how they shift with variations (like precipitates and matrix) in the sample.

== History ==
Atomic force acoustic microscopy (AFAM) was originally developed by Rabe and Arnold from the Fraunhofer Institute of Nondestructive Testing in 1994. The technique is now used for qualitative and quantitative measurements of the local elastic properties of materials. AFAM was used by Anish Kumar et al. to map the precipitates in the polycrystalline materials.

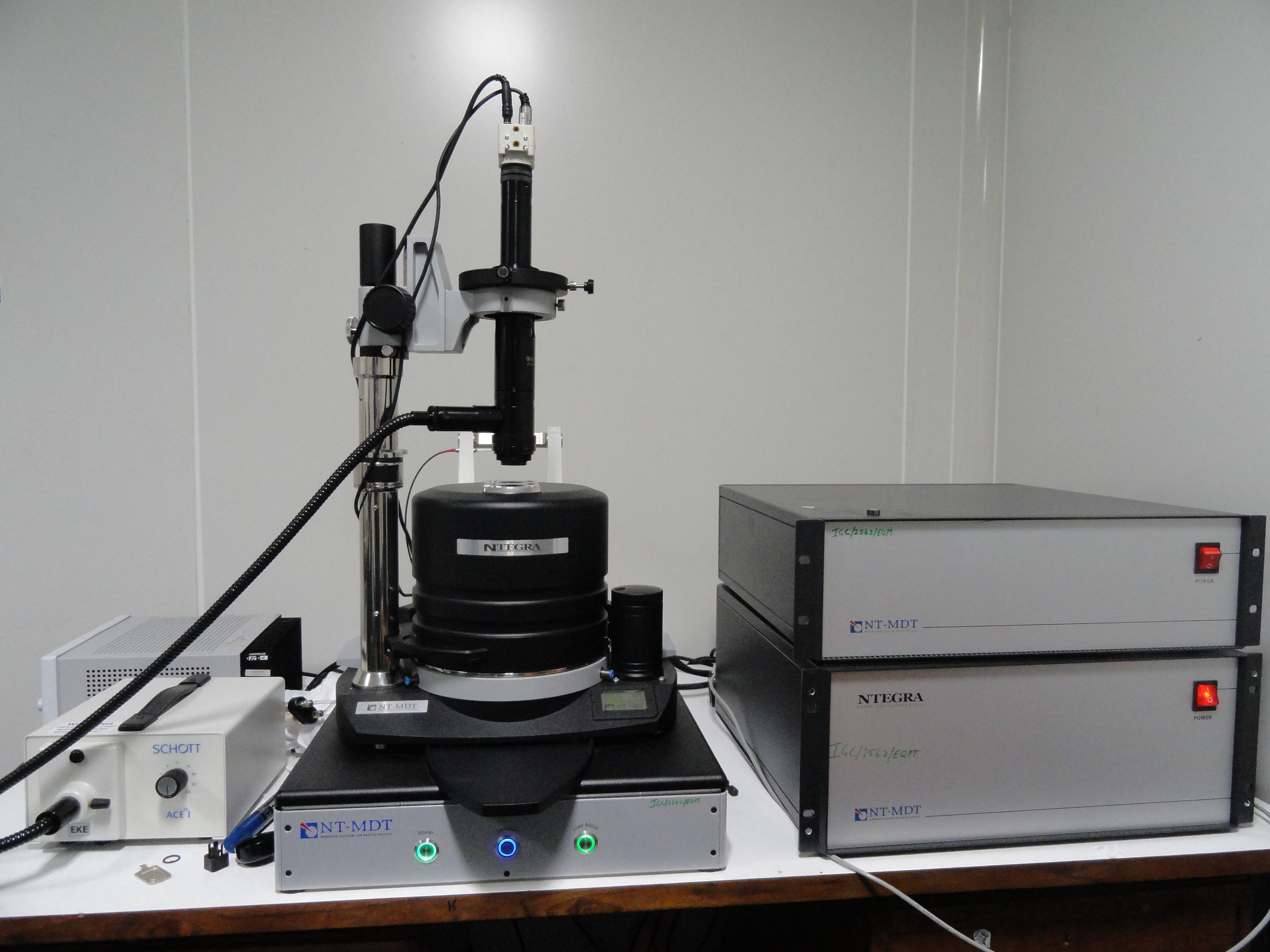
Atomic force acoustic microscopy system

== Principle ==
In the AFAM setup the sample is coupled to a piezoelectric transducer. This emits longitudinal acoustic waves into the sample, causing out-of-plane vibrations in the sample's surface. The vibrations are transmitted into the cantilever via the sensor tip. The cantilever vibrations are measured by a 4-section photo-diode and evaluated by a lock-in amplifier. This setup can be used either to acquire cantilever vibration spectra or to take acoustic images. The latter are maps of cantilever amplitudes on a fixed excitation frequency near the resonance. A contact-mode topography image is acquired simultaneously with the acoustic one.

The frequency range employed covers the flexural modes of the cantilever from 10 kHz up to 5 MHz, with an average frequency of around 3 MHz. It can be used to map the elastic modulus variations between the precipitates and matrix of a material, such that even the elastic properties of the thin films can be determined. It can be used in air, vacuum and liquid media.

Probes used for AFAM are made up of silicon nitride (Si_{3}N_{4}) or silicon (Si). Cantilevers with low spring constants (0.01-0.5 N/m) for soft materials and high spring constants (42-50 N/m) for hard materials are used. Within the probe structure, the cantilever and tip material may not be same. Tips are usually manufactured using anisotropic etching or vapor deposition. The probe is placed at an angle around 11-15 degrees from the horizontal axis.

Two models are used for the calculations in AFAM: the cantilever dynamics model and the contact mechanics model. Using these two models the elastic properties of the materials can be determined. All the calculations are done using LabView software. The frequency of the eigen modes of the cantilever depends, amongst other parameters, on the stiffness of the tip-sample contact and on the contact radius, which in turn are both a function of the Young's modulus of the sample and the tip, the tip radius, the load exerted by the tip, and the geometry of the surface. Such a technique allows one to determine the Young's modulus from the contact stiffness with a resolution of a few tens of nanometers, mode sensitivity is about 5%.

== Models ==
For calculation of the elastic properties of the materials we need to consider two models: cantilever dynamic model - calculation of the k* (contact stiffness); and Hertz contact model - contact mechanics - calculation of the reduced elastic modulus (E*) of the sample considering the contact area.

== Procedure to calculate the elastic properties of various materials ==
Use of the two models mentioned above will take us to correct determination of the various elastic properties for various materials. The steps needed to be considered for the calculation are:

- Acquire the contact resonances for any two bending modes.
- The two modes can be acquired separately or simultaneously. Importance of simultaneous acquisition has been demonstrated by Phani et al.
- By measuring the contact-resonance frequencies of two modes, one can write two equations containing two unknown values L1 and k*. By plotting k* as a function of the tip position (L1/L) for the two modes, one obtains two curves, the cross-point of which yields a unique value of k* of the system using both modes.
- Using the Hertz contact model, k* can be converted to E*. As accurate measurement of R of the tip is very difficult; measurement on a reference sample is carried out to eliminate the requirement of knowing the value of R. The reference sample may be an amorphous material or a single crystal.

== Advantages over other SPM processes ==
- Frequency shifts are easier to measure accurately than absolute amplitudes or phase.
- Can be used in air as well as liquid environment like (in a droplet).
- Can test any type of material.
- Atomic level resolution.
- Flaw characterization and detection of hidden structures can be done.
- Quantitative characterization of nano material layers.
- Quantitative and qualitative measurements at the nano scale.
- Damping measurements at nano level which can give actual idea of crack initiation and propagation which are very important in the case of structural materials.

== See also ==
- Scanning tunneling microscopy
- Ultrasonic force microscopy
- Scanning near-field ultrasound holography
- Scanning probe microscopy
- Scanning acoustic microscope
- Hooke's law
