= Scanning near-field ultrasound holography =

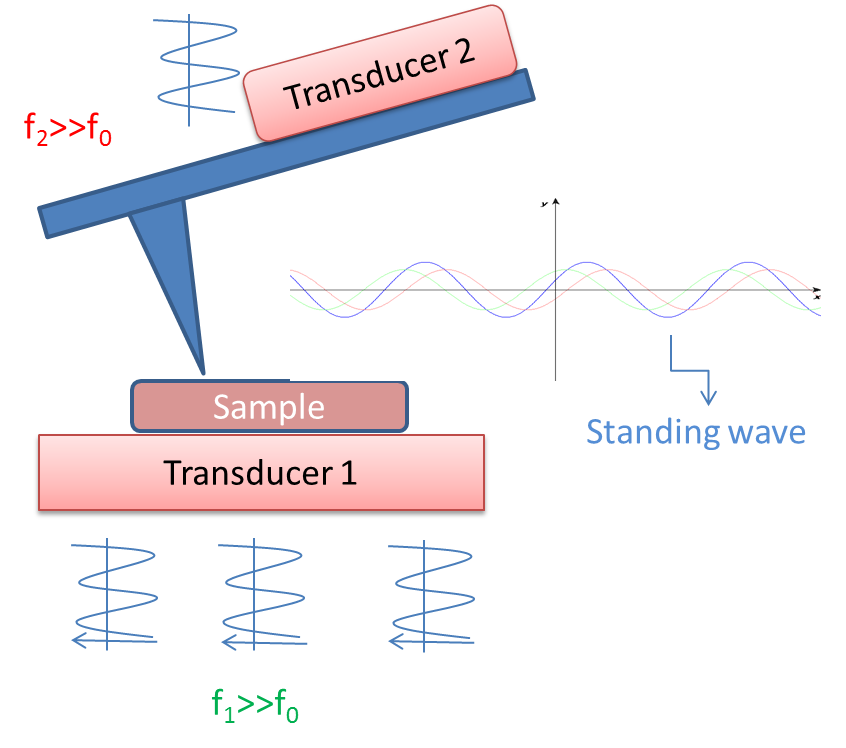
Scanning near-field ultrasound holography principle

Scanning near-field ultrasound holography (SNFUH) is a method for performing nondestructive nano-scale high-resolution imaging of buried and embedded structures. SNFUH is critical for analysis of materials, structures and phenomena as they continue to shrink at the micro/nano scale. SNFUH is a type of scanning probe microscopy (SPM) technique that provides depth information as well as spatial resolution at the 10 to 100 nm scale.

== History ==
Gajendra S. Shekhawat and Vinayak P. Dravid of Northwestern University (Evanston, IL, USA) developed SNFUH in 2005. Observing copper damascene structures of a void in an opaque material was made possible by this technique.

== Technique ==
Scanning near-field ultrasound holography combines atomic force acoustic microscopy and ultrasonic force microscopy. Two transducers producing high frequencies are used. Usually frequency is higher than the resonant frequency of the cantilever. One transducer is placed below the sample and the other attached to the cantilever. The cantilever can be called as SPM acoustic antenna which senses the interference of acoustic waves sent by the transducers. The interference of these waves forms surface acoustic standing waves. The wave's frequencies are slightly different. The perturbations to phase and amplitude of the surface acoustic standing wave are locally monitored by the antenna via the lock-in approach and the SPM electronic module. This electronic module was developed by Shekhawat and Dravid. It was implemented with a radio frequency (RF) lock in approach.

Two modes are used: Soft contact mode is for hard structures. In the near contact mode, the tip is first made to touch the surface and then lift f 2-5 nm is used for biological samples.

== Advantages over other SPM techniques ==
This technique takes advantage of both the phase and amplitude of scattered ultrasound waves to produce nanoscale resolution images of internal substructures. It is nondestructive and provides real space imaging, depth information, hidden information in materials, spatial resolution at the 10- 100 nm scale and can study various material systems.

== See also ==
- Acoustic microscopy
- Scanning acoustic microscope
