= Calvin Quate =

American electrical engineer

- Born: Calvin Forrest Quate; December 7, 1923; Baker, Nevada, U.S.
- Died: July 6, 2019 (aged 95); Menlo Park, California, U.S.
- Education: University of Utah (B.S.) (1944); Stanford University (Ph.D.) (1950)
- Known for: Atomic force microscopy; Acoustic microscopy
- Awards: IEEE Medal of Honor (1988); National Medal of Science (1992); Kavli Prize (2016)
- Scientific career
- Fields: Electrical engineering
- Workplaces: PARC; Sandia National Labs; Stanford University
- Thesis: Traveling wave tubes as low noise amplifiers (1950)
- Doctoral students: Abdullah Atalar; Alison Baski

Calvin Forrest Quate (December 7, 1923 – July 6, 2019) was an American electrical engineer and physicist best known for his contributions to microscopy. He was on the faculty of Stanford University from 1961 until his retirement in 2004.

== Education ==
He earned his bachelor's degree in electrical engineering from the University of Utah College of Engineering in 1944, and his Ph.D. from Stanford University in 1950.

== Career and research ==
Quate is known for his work on acoustic and atomic force microscopy. The scanning acoustic microscope, which Quate invented with colleague R. A. Lemons in 1973, has resolution exceeding optical microscopes, revealing structure in opaque or even transparent materials not visible to optics.

In 1981, Quate read about a new type of microscope able to examine electrically conductive materials. Together with Gerd Binnig and Christoph Gerber, he developed a related instrument that would work on non-conductive materials, including biological tissue, and the atomic force microscope was born. AFM traces surface contours using a needle to maintain constant pressure against the surface to reveal atomic detail. AFM is the foundation of the $100 million nanotechnology industry. Binnig, Quate and Gerber were rewarded with the Kavli Prize in 2016 for developing the atomic force microscope.

Quate was a member of the National Academy of Engineering and National Academy of Sciences, having been elected to the former for his contributions to "research, teaching, and management in microwave and solid-state electronics." He was awarded the 1980 IEEE Morris N. Liebmann Memorial Award and the IEEE Medal of Honor in 1988 for "the invention and development of the scanning acoustic microscope." Quate became a senior research fellow at the Palo Alto Research Center (PARC) in 1984. In 2000, he became a recipient of the Joseph F. Keithley Award For Advances in Measurement Science. He was a fellow of the Norwegian Academy of Science and Letters. Quate died on July 6, 2019, at the age of 95.
