= Oleg Figovsky =

- אולג פיגובסקי
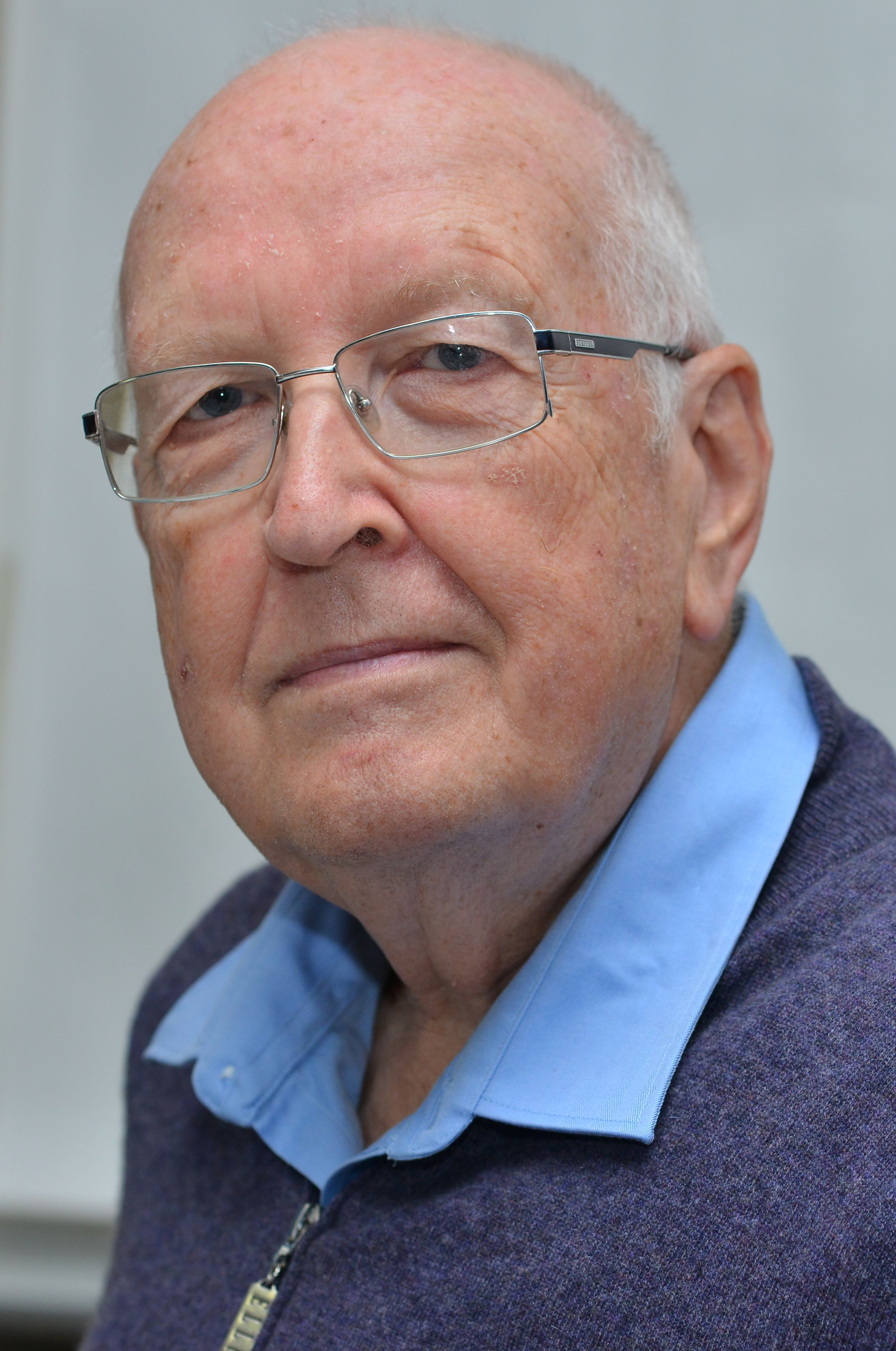
- Oleg Figovsky
- Born: February 9, 1940; Moscow, USSR
- Occupations: composite materials, nanomaterials, nanotechnology, nanocellulose, material science, adhesion.

Academic background
- Education: ACECI
- Website: Professor Oleg Figovsky

Olég Figóvsky (Hebrew: אולג פיגובסקי; born April 9, 1940) is an Israeli inventor who has made or overseen over 500 inventions (in the USSR, invention was the equivalent of a patent, see Изобретение (право) (in Russian).

In 1982, he developed the first nanostructured anticorrosive composite materials based on LG-matrix, where nanoparticles are forming during technological process by hydrolysis of TFS (Tetra-furfuril-oxy-silane). Several nanotechnologies invented and developed by Figovsky successfully have reached industrial production in the US, Canada, China, Mexico, Russia and Israel.

He has served as the chairman of the UNESCO "Green Chemistry," the President of Israeli Association of Inventors (IAI), founder and director of International Nanotechnology Research Center Polymate (1998–2018), Director of R&D at Eurotech, Ltd. (1998–2008).

== Biography ==
Oleg Figovsky was born on 9 April 1940 in Moscow into a family of engineers. Interested in physics, chemistry and science from early school years, Oleg had a hard time getting into university of his choice. Not for a lack of talent, he was hindered by State-imposed anti semitic limitations, which were based only on the fact of a young person being a Jew, and did not consider abilities and school grades. Despite that obstacle Oleg managed to get a bachelor's degree in chemistry from another University. His scientific career began when he was 18 at NII Mosstroy, Moscow Building Research Institute. Back then his first invention was "Nanoasphalt Concrete". At the age of 20 he presented his first scientific report at the seminar of Professor Davidov, Vice President of the Russian Academy of Architecture and Construction Sciences.

He graduated from the Faculty of Technology of VZISI (USSR Civil Engineering Institute, now MGAKHIS) what would be equivalent to a Master of Science Degree and continued working while studying at NII Mosstroy. During this period, he wrote "Polyether and Polyurethane Resins in Construction" and created more than 25 inventions, including industrial and construction adhesive "Bustilat", which later became hugely popular and got mass-produced by more than 20 companies of the Soviet Union. After graduation Professor Figovsky joined the corrosion protection laboratory of USSR Research Institute "Teploproekt" and established a scientific school on the chemical resistance of non-metallic materials. After writing his Candidate's thesis (Ph.D. equivalent), he joined the Central Research Institute for industrial buildings of USSR State Building Committee, where he developed a series of original compositions and designs for monolithic flooring, published two books on the floors of industrial buildings and created over 40 inventions in the field of materials for corrosion protection. In 1981 Professor Figovsky became the head of the non-metallic materials department at the Interdisciplinary Scientific Research Complex "Anti-Cor" of the State Committee for Science and Technology (USSR), where he was especially interested in development of materials for extreme conditions, including those for the nuclear and space industries. In 1982 he has developed the first nanostructured anticorrosive composite materials based on LG-matrix, where nanoparticles are forming during technological process by hydrolysis of TFS (Tetra-furfuril-oxy-silane). He subsequently created high heat resistant and flame retardant composites for the aerospace industry.

He is the author of the work "The Anticorrosion Service of Industrial Buildings"; Professor Figovsky created more than 50 inventions, a significant part of which was adopted by industries. At the same time, he taught at the Organic Building Materials and Plastics Department at the Moscow Institute of Civil Engineering and supervised a number of Ph.D. students. In 1986 he became the head of the Corrosion Protection Department at the USSR Chemical Industry Research Institute and at the same time acted as Deputy Director of the institute responsible for coordination of all corrosion protection works in that ministry. While working there he published several reviews on corrosion protection techniques and created more than 50 inventions, as well as his Doctor of Science thesis (Final academic Degree in USSR).

Since 1991, Oleg Figovsky has been working in Israel, first as a deputy director of the Israel Corrosion Research Institute (Ramat HaSharon) and director of the Polyadd Technology Company (Nazareth Illit, now Nof HaGalil), publishing his works frequently in European and American scientific journals and speaking at international conferences, mostly in the field of special purpose composites. In 1998 Oleg Figovsky founded Polymate research center (Migdal HaEmek), where new materials and production methods are designed, the focus is mainly on nanotechnology processes. In recent years, he has received more than 30 patents (mostly from the US) and published more than 50 original scientific papers, including 3 articles in the Encyclopedia of Surface and Colloid Science (USA).

In 2014 two monographs by him were published - "Advanced Polymer Concretes and Compounds" (USA) and "Nanomaterials Based on Soluble Silicates" (Germany), and in 2017 "Green Nanotechnology" (USA) got published. He is a member of the European Academy of sciences. He is also president of the Israeli Association of Inventors (IAI), foreign academician of RAASN and REA (Russian academies of sciences), Honorary Professor and Doctor in 5 universities in Poland and Russia, head of the UNESCO Chair “Green Chemistry” and member of the International Scientific Council of the Russian Peoples' Friendship University in engineering sciences.

The new nanotechnologies invented by Prof. Figovsky became the foundation for several industrial productions in the US, Canada, China, Mexico, Russia and Israel. For his inventions in nanotechnologies, he was awarded gold and silver medals at IENA-98 and the Gold Angel Prize (Nuremberg, Germany).

1999–2019 he was the Editor-in-Chief of the "Innovations in Corrosion and Materials Science" Journal. Since 2008 he has been the Editor of the Open Corrosion Journal, and since 2014 of the RPCS – journal (USA). He is a member of the editorial board of 5 international journals. He is a member of the editorial board of the journal “Nauka i Zhizn Izrailya”. His three-volume monograph on innovation systems was published in 2019–2021. Oleg Figovsky has more than 520 patents for his inventions.

== Membership, editorial and teaching activity ==
- Editor-in-Chief of the ICMS-journal;
- Academician of European Academy of Sciences, REA and RAASN (since 2006);
- President of Israel Association of Inventors;
- Co-chairman of the UNESCO "Green Chemistry";
- Distinguish professor of KSTU(KAI) and VGASU (Russia);
- Honorary Professor of WSG (Poland);

== Awards and honours ==
- Holder of orders “Engineering Glory”, "Antoine de Saint-Exupery" & medal "Holy Land of Israel";
- Laureate of the Golden Angel Prize, NASA Nanotech Briefs®’ Nano 50™ Award(United States);
- Laureate of the 2015 Presidential Green Chemistry Challenge Award (United States);
- Laureate of the 2017 & 2019 Albert Nelson Marquis Lifetime Achievement Award (United States).
- Gold & Silver medals (IENA-98 Exhibition, Nuremberg, Germany);
- Medal "Leading Intellectual of the World" (Harvard, USA);
- Gold Angel Prize ("Genoius-2006", Budapest, Hungary);
- Diploma of Honorable Member of Moscow Society of Explorers of Nature (Moscow, Russia);
- Badge of Honor “ Engineering Merit” (Russia);
- Order «Engineering Glory» (Russia).

== Works ==
=== Books ===
- O. Figovsky, New technologies and Science in Modern Word, part 2, VOIR, 2023, 346 pages. (in Russian & English)
- O. Figovsky, New technologies and Science in Modern Word. VOIR, 2022, 188 pages. (in Russian)
- O. Figovsky & O. Pensky, The Future is Beginning Today - Etudes about New Tendency in Science. PSNRU, 2021, 345 pages. (in Russian)
- P. Kudryavtsev, O. Figovsky: Nanomaterials based on soluble silicates. Lambert A.P., 2014, 241 pages.
- Фиговский О. Л., Пенский О. Г. Люди и роботы. Москва : РУДН, 2021. 368 с.
- Фиговский О. Л., Пенский О. Г. Будущее начинается сегодня. Этюды о новых тенденциях в науке: научное издание / О.Л. Фиговский, О.Г. Пенский; Перм. гос. нац. исслед. ун-т. Пермь, 2021. 348 с.
- O. Figovsky, V. Gumarov: Innovative Systems: Man and Artificial Intellect. RYDH, Moscow, 2020, 520 pages.
- Encyclopedia of Surface and Colloid Science. Editor P. Somasundaran, N.Y., Taylor & Francis Group, CRC Press, 2006: O. Figovsky: Active Fillers for Composite Materials: Interaction with Penetrated Media. V. 1, pp. 94–96; O. Figovsky, L. Shapovalov: Cyclocarbonate Based Polymers Including Non-Isocyanate Polyurethane Adhesives and Coatings. V. 3, pp. 1633–1653; O. Figovsky: Polymeric Coating Interfaces. V. 6, pp. 4966–4972.
- O. Figovsky, V. Gumarov: Innovative Systems: Perspectives & Forecasts, Lambert Academic Publishing, 2019. 448 pages (in Russian).
- O. Figovsky, V. Gumarov: Innovative Systems: Advantages & Problems, Lambert Academic Publishing, 2018. 646 pages (in Russian).
- O. Figovsky, D. Beilin: Green Nanotechnology, Pan Stanford Publishing, 2017. 538 pages.
- P. Kudryavtsev, O. Figovsky: Sol-gel technology of porous composites, Lambert Academic Publishing, 2015. 468 pages (in Russian).
- P. Kudryavtsev, O. Figovsky: Nanomaterials Based on Soluble Silicates (in Russian), Lambert Academic Publishing, 2014. 248 pages
- O. Figovsky, D. Beilin: Advanced Polymer Concretes and Compounds. Taylor & Francis Group, CRC Press, 2013. 272 pages.
- I.A. Stepanov, N.Ya. Savel'eva, O. Figovsky: The Anticorrosion Service of Plants.(Антикоррозионная служба предприятий Metallurgizdat, Moscow, 1987. 240 pages (in Russian).
- O. Figovsky, V.V. Kozlov, A.B. Sholokhova at al.: Handbook of Adhesives and Gluing Mastics in Building (Справочник по клеям и мастикам в строительстве). Stroiizdat, Moscow, 1984. 230 pages (in Russian).
- I.A. Stepanov, N.Ya. Savel'eva, O. Figovsky: The Anticorrosion Service of Plants.(Антикоррозионная служба предприятий Metallurgizdat, Moscow, 1987. 240 pages (in Russian).
- O. Figovsky, V.V. Kozlov, A.B. Sholokhova at al.: Handbook of Adhesives and Gluing Mastics in Building (Справочник по клеям и мастикам в строительстве). Stroiizdat, Moscow, 1984. 230 pages (in Russian).
- V. Ya. Dolmatov, I. P. Kim, O. Figovsky at al.: The Floors of Industrial Buildings (Полы промышленных зданий). Stroiizdat, Moscow, 1978. 136 pages (in Russian).
- O.L. Figovsky, O.I. Bol'shakov and I. N. Vihareva, Nonisocyanate Polyurethanes - Green Solutions. URSU, 112 pages.

=== Articles ===
- Figovsky Oleg. Mathematical programming - the way in future. Journal "Nuclear Strategy XXI", #206, 2024, pp. 3–6. (in Russian)
- Figovsky Oleg. Ecological treats. Journal "Nuclear Strategy XXI", #210, 2024, pp. 4–6. (in Russian)
- Figovsky Oleg. And longer century will be protracted in the artificial intellect century. Journal "Nuclear Strategy", #211, 2024, pp31–33. (in Russian)
- Oleg Figovsky & Dr. Nelly Blank. Research on Increasing the Durability of Polymer Coatings Based on Epoxy Rubber Binders. China Coating, #1, 2024, pp. 6–14
- Oleg Figovsky, Arkady Shteinbok, Nelly Blank. Green Nanotechnology. Journal of Materials and Polymer Science, Volume 3, issue 4, 2023, pp 1–3.
- Figovsky Oleg, Pushkarev Yury, Shteinbok. Protective Coating Based on Liquid Ebonite and Water Dispersion CSPE. China Coating Journal, November 2023, pp 26–37
- Evdokimov Yu.M., Figovskiy O.L. Research development by generation of electromagnetic radiation under adhesion contact breach (review). (in Russian) FORESTRY BULLETIN No. 4, 2023, vol. 27, pages. 147-158.
- O. Figovsky, Yu. Pushkarev, A. Shteinbok. Anti-corrosion coating based on liquid ebonite mixtures and water dispersion of chlorine-sulfured polyethylene. Engineering Journal of Don, #7, 2023.
- O. Figovsky, B. Akselrod. Flame retardant coatings: a review of issues lowering down attraction of private venture investment. Engineering Journal of Don, #7, 2023.
- Figovsky Oleg & Shteibok Arkady. Some of the Most Innovative 3d Printing Additive Manufacturing Technologies. China Coating Journal 65, July 2023, pp. 58–65.
- O.L. Figovsky & V.I. Loganina, Durability of Coatings Based on Sol-Silicate Paint. China Coating Journal, Mart 2022, pp. 20–31. (in Chinese)
- Oleg Figovsky, Producing Nanomembranes by Novel Methods. Handbook of Nanomaterials and Nanocomposites for Energy and Environmental Application, Springer, 2021, pp. 1–19.
- O.L. Figovsky, Nonisocyanate hybrid polyurethane flooring based on cyclic carbonates: optimal compositions and service properties, Journal of Physics (IOP Conf.Series 1425), 012185, 2020, pp. 1–8.
- Valentin Ushkov, Oleg Figovsky, Vladimir Smirnov, Vyacheslav Seleznev. Fire-Resisting Composites Based on Polymer Matrix. JCCT, 2019, Volume 13, Number 1, pp. 77–84. Full article text
- O.L. Figovsky, Advanced Methods of Track Nanomembranes' Productions. Engineering Vestnik of Don, Rostov RU, No.1, 2019.
- A.S. Rassokyin, A.N. Ponomarev, O.L. Figovsky, Silica fumes of different types for high-performance fine-grained concrete, Civil Engineering Journal, S. Petersburg, 2018, No. 2(78), pp. 151–160.
- V.A. Ushkov, O.L. Figovsky, Fire-Resisting Composites Based on Polymer Matrix, International Journal of Engineering and Technologies. Switzerland, Vol.14, pp 1–13
- A.S. Rassokyin, A.N. Ponomarev, O.L. Figovsky, Ultra-light composite wood-polymer structural materials in construction, Civil Engineering Journal, S. Petersburg, 2018, No. 3(79), pp. 132–139.
- O.L. Figovsky, High termo-stable silicate-polymer adhesives based on OASS and application in Military Industries, Proceedings of III international conference "Modern Advantages in Adhesives & Hermetic", Dezdzyincs. RF, September 11–13, 2019, pp 66–68.
- V.A. Ushkov, O.L. Figovsky, V.A. Smirnov, V.A. Seleznev : Epoxy Matrix Composites for Fire-Safe Construction, Scientific Israel – Technological Advantages, 2017, Vol. 19, no. 4, pp. 52–64.
- V.A. Ushkov, O.L. Figovsky, V.A. Smirnov, V.A. Seleznev : Epoxy Matrix Composites for Fire-Safe Construction, Scientific Israel – Technological Advantages, 2017, Vol. 19, no. 4, pp. 52–64.
- O. Figovsky, L. Shapovalov : Properties and Reactivity of Cyclocarbonates, Scientific Israel – Technological Advantages, 2017, Vol. 19, no.4, pp. 65–71
- N. Bogdanovich, M. Arkhilin, A. Menshina, L. Kuznetsova, A. Kanarskii, N. Voropaeva, O. Figovsky : Magneto Susceptible Adsorbents Obtained by Thermochemical Activation of Hydrolytic Lignin With Iron(III) Hydroxide. Chem. Chem. Technol., 2017, Vol. 11, No. 2, pp. 209–213
- A. Cornille, R. Auvergne, O. Figovsky, B. Boutevin, S. Caillol : A Perspective Approach to Sustainable Routes for Non-Isocyanate Polyurethanes. European Polymer Journal, 2017, 87, pp. 535–552
- O. Figovsky, D. Beilin, N. Blank : Creation of New High Corrosion Resistant Polymer Coatings Based on the Effect "Positive Corrosion". Innov. Corr. Mater. Sci., 2017, 7, pp. 1–10.
- O. Figovsky, O. Birukova, L. Shapovalov, A. Trossman : Nonisocyanate Polyurethanes and Prospects of their Implementation in Industrial Production. Scientific Israel – Technological Advantages, 2017, Vol. 19, no. 1, pp. 13–28.
- V.V. Karpachev, J.J. Spiridonov, N.L.Voropaeva, A.G. Tkachev, N.V. Shachnev, O.L. Figovsky : Pre-Sowing Seed Treatment Nanotechnology with Environment-Friendly Nanotube-Based Nanochips. International Letters of Natural Science, 2016, 58, pp. 29–34
- O. Figovsky, D. Pashin, Z. Khalitov and D. Valeeva: Crystallography of Coaxial and Scroll Nanotubes of Arbitrary Composition. Chemistry & Chemical Technology, 2015, Vol. 9, No. 1, pp. 19–27.
- N. Voropaeva, V. Karpachev, V. Varlamov, Oleg Figovsky: Influence of Improved (Nano) Systems on Cultivated Corn Growth, Development and Yield. International Letters of Chemistry, Physics and Astronomy, 2014, No. 28, pp 1–7.
- Oleg Figovsky. Novel US patents on the 3D – print. IVD-journal, No. 7, 2014.
- O. Figovsky, Yu. Potapov, D. Panfilov, S. Kashtanov, E. Yudin: Research of defect distribution in fibre rubcon structure by Monte Carlo method. Eastern-European Journal of Enterprise Technologies, 2014, Vol. 6, No. 11 (72), pp. 21– 25 (in Russian).
- O. Figovsky, Yu. Potapov, A. Polikutin, D. P. Nguen: Strength of normal sections of two-layer rubcon-concrete bending elements of building structures. Eastern-European Journal of Enterprise Technologies, 2014, Vol. 6, No. 11 (72), pp. 14–20 (in Russian).
- O. Figovsky, D. Pashin, Z. Khalitov and A. Khadiev: The Quantitative Theory of Diffraction by Spiral Nanotubes, Chemistry & Chemical Technology, 2014, Vol. 8, No. 1, pp. 41–50.
- O. Figovsky, E. Gotlib, D. Pashin et al.: Production of polymer nanomembranes by super deep penetration method. Chemictry & Chemical Technology, 2012, Vol. 6, No. 4, pp. 393–396.
- O. Figovsky, D. Pashin, Z. Khalitov, D. Valeeva: The structure and diffraction by chiral nanotubes of arbitrary composition. Chemistry & Chemical Technology, 2012, Vol. 6, No. 2, pp. 167–177.
- J. Owsik, K. Jach, O. Figovsky et al.: The physics of super deep penetration phenomenon. Journal of Technical Physics, 2008, Vol. 49, No.1, pp. 3–25.
- A. Ponomarenko, O. Figovsky, V. Shevchenko: Multifunctional polymer composites for “intellectual” structures: present state, problem, future. Advanced Materials Research, 2008, Vol. 47–50, pp. 81–84.
- V. Shevchenko, V. Volkov, O. Figovsky et al.: Electromagnetic wave shielding and fire retardant multifunctional polymer composites. Advanced Materials Research, 2008, Vol. 47–50, pp. 77–80.
- Figovsky Oleg, Flocculation of Paper Mill Effluents Using Starch-G-Polyacrylamide Flocculants, Research & Development in Material Science, 29/10 1998
- V. Kominar and O. Figovsky. The mechanisms of failure of thick protective coverings. Corrosion Science, Vol. 35, Nos 5-8, pp. 1405–1408, 1993.
- G. Sh. Ekazashvili, O.L. Figovsky, A. S. Samoylovich. The flow of viscous fluids along horizontal surface. Bulletin of the Academy of Sciences of the Georgian SSR. Vol. 138, No 1, pp. 81–84, 1990.
- O. Figovsky. Improving the protective properties of nonmetallic corrosion-resistant materials and coatings. Zhurnal Vses. Khim.Ob-va im D.I. Mendeleeva, Vol.33, No. 3, pp. 31–36, 1988 (by Allerton Press Inc.)
