= Acoustic interferometer =

Instrument that measures acoustic properties

An acoustic interferometer is an instrument that uses interferometry to measure the physical characteristics of sound waves in a gas or liquid. It may be used to measure velocity, wavelength, absorption, or impedance of the sound waves. The principle of operation is that a vibrating crystal creates ultrasonic waves that are radiated into the medium being analyzed. The waves strike a reflector placed parallel to the crystal. The waves are then reflected back to the source and measured.

== See also ==
- Acoustic microscopy
- Acoustic emission
