= Alison Baski =

American surface scientist and academic administrator

Alison Aili Baski is an American physicist and academic administrator, the dean of science at California State Polytechnic University, Pomona, and a former president of the American Vacuum Society. Her research has focused on surface science, and particularly on silicon surfaces.

== Education and career ==
Baski majored in engineering physics at the University of Colorado Boulder. She completed a Ph.D. in applied physics at Stanford University. Her 1991 doctoral dissertation, Scanning tunneling microscopy of metal growth and reconstruction on Si(100) and Si(111), was supervised by Calvin Quate.

She became a professor of physics at Virginia Commonwealth University, with a joint appointment in engineering, and served there as chair of physics, executive associate dean, and interim dean of humanities and sciences. She was the 2012 president of the American Vacuum Society. In 2016 she moved to Cal Poly Pomona as dean of the College of Science.

== Recognition ==
Baski is a 2010 Fellow of the American Association for the Advancement of Science, and a 2015 Fellow of the American Vacuum Society.
