= Scanning acoustic microscope =

Device using focused sound to evaluate an object

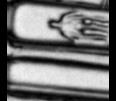
A US penny scanned in an acoustic microscope at 50 MHz

A scanning acoustic microscope (SAM) is a device which uses focused sound to investigate, measure, or image an object (a process called scanning acoustic tomography). It is commonly used in failure analysis and non-destructive evaluation. It also has applications in biological and medical research. The semiconductor industry has found the SAM useful in detecting voids, cracks, and delaminations within microelectronic packages.

The joint IPC/JEDEC standard J-STD-035 specifies acoustic microscopy procedures for detecting delaminations, cracks and voids in nonhermetic plastic-encapsulated components; it was first published in 1999 and revised as J-STD-035A in 2022. As devices have become smaller, multilayered and more densely mounted, and as wafer bonding has spread, inspection has extended from packaged parts to bonded 300 mm wafers, and fully automated in-line systems that load, inspect, judge and sort parts are used in volume production alongside laboratory instruments. In the semiconductor industry the same class of instrument is also called a scanning acoustic tomograph (SAT), a term used by Hitachi for its FineSAT series, while the name C-SAM originated with Sonoscan (now Nordson SONOSCAN).

== History ==
The first scanning acoustic microscope (SAM), with a 50 MHz ultrasonic lens, was developed in 1974 by R. A. Lemons and C. F. Quate at the Microwave Laboratory of Stanford University. A few years later, in 1980, the first high-resolution (with a frequency up to 500 MHz) through-transmission SAM was built by R.Gr. Maev and his students at his Laboratory of Biophysical Introscopy of the Russian Academy of Sciences. First commercial SAM ELSAM, with a broad frequency range from 100 MHz up to 1.8 GHz, was built at the Ernst Leitz GmbH by the group led by Martin Hoppe and his consultants Abdullah Atalar (Stanford University), Roman Maev (Russian Academy of Sciences) and Andrew Briggs (Oxford University.)

Since then, many improvements to such systems have been made to enhance resolution and accuracy. Most of them were described in detail in the monograph Advanced in Acoustic Microscopy, Ed. by Andrew Briggs, 1992, Oxford University Press and in monograph by Roman Maev, Acoustic Microscopy Fundamentals and Applications, Monograph, Wiley & Son - VCH, 291 pages, August 2008, as well as recently in.

== C-SAM versus other techniques ==
There are many methods for failure analysis of damages in microelectronic packages, including laser decapsulation, wet etch decapsulation, optical microscopy, and SEM microscopy. The problem with most of these methods is the fact that they are destructive. This means it’s possible that the damage itself will be done during preparation. Also, most of these destructive methods need time-consuming and complicated sample preparation. So, in most cases, it is important to study damages with a non-destructive technique. And unlike other non-destructive techniques such as X-ray, CSAM is highly sensitive to the elastic properties of the materials it travels through. For example, CSAM is highly sensitive to the presence of delaminations and air-gaps at sub-micron thicknesses, so it is particularly useful for inspection of small, complex devices.

== Physical principle ==
The technique makes use of the high penetration depth of acoustic waves to image the internal structure of the specimen. So, in scanning acoustic microscopy either reflected or transmitted acoustic waves are processed to analyze the internal features. When the acoustic wave propagates though the sample it may be scattered, absorbed or reflected at media interfaces. Thus, the technique registers the echo generated by the acoustic impedance (Z) contrast between two materials. Scanning acoustic microscopy works by directing focused sound from a transducer at a small point on a target object. Sound hitting the object is either scattered, absorbed, reflected (scattered at 180°) or transmitted (scattered at 0°). It is possible to detect the scattered pulses travelling in a particular direction. A detected pulse informs of the presence of a boundary or object. The `time of flight' of the pulse is defined as the time taken for it to be emitted by an acoustic source, scattered by an object and received by the detector, which is usually coincident with the source. The time of flight can be used to determine the distance of the inhomogeneity from the source given knowledge of the speed through the medium.

Based on the measurement, a value is assigned to the location investigated. The transducer (or object) is moved slightly and then insonified again. This process is repeated in a systematic pattern until the entire region of interest has been investigated. Often the values for each point are assembled into an image of the object. The contrast seen in the image is based either on the object's geometry or material composition. The resolution of the image is limited either by the physical scanning resolution or the width of the sound beam (which in turn is determined by the frequency of the sound).

== Methodology ==
Different types of analysis modes are available in high-definition SAM. The main three modes are A-scans, B-scans, and C-scans. Each one provides different information about the integrity of the sample’s structure.

The A-scan is the amplitude of the echo signal over ToF. The transducer is mounted on the z-axis of the SAM. It can be focused to a specific target layer located in a hard-to-access area by changing the z-position with respect to the sample under testing that is mechanically fixed.

The B-scan provides a vertical cross section of the sample with visualization of the depth information. It is a very good feature when it comes to damage detection in the cross section.

The C-scan is a commonly used scanning mode, which gives 2D images (slices) of a target layer at a specific depth in the samples; multiple equidistant layers are feasible through the X-scan mode.

=== Pulse-reflection method ===
2D or 3D-dimensional images of the internal structure become available by means of the pulse-reflection method, in which the impedance mismatch between two materials leads to a reflection of the ultrasonic beam. Phase inversion of the reflected signal can allow for discrimination of the delamination (acoustic impedance almost zero) from inclusions and particles, but not from air bubbles, which show same impedance behavior as delamination.

The higher the impedance mismatch at the interface, the higher the intensity of the reflected signal (more brightness in the 2D image), which is measured by the echo amplitude. In the case of an interface with air (Z = 0), total reflection of the ultrasonic wave occurs; therefore, SAM is highly sensitive to any entrapped air in the sample under testing.

In order to enhance the insertion of the acoustic wave into the specimen both the acoustic transducer and the sample are immersed in a coupling media, typically water, to avoid the high reflection at air interfaces.

In the pulse-wave mode, a lens having good focusing properties on an axis is used to focus the ultrasonic waves onto a spot on the specimen and to receive the reflected waves back from the spot, typically in less than 100 ns. The acoustic beam can be focused to a sufficiently small spot at a depth up to 2–3 mm to resolve typical interlaminar cracks and other critical crack geometries. The received echoes are analysed and stored for each point to build up an image of the entire scanned area. The reflected signal is monitored and sent to a synchronous display to develop a complete image, as in a scanning electron microscope.

== Applications ==
- Fast production control - Standards : IPC A610, Mil-Std883, J-Std-035, Esa, etc - Parts sorting - Inspection of solder pads, flip-chip, underfill, die-attach - Sealing joints - Brazed and welded joints - Qualification and fast selection of glues, adhesive, comparative analyses of aging, etc - Inclusions, heterogeneities, porosities, cracks in material

=== Medicine and biology ===
SAM can provide data on the elasticity of cells and tissues, which can give useful information on the physical forces holding structures in a particular shape and the mechanics of structures such as the cytoskeleton. These studies are particularly valuable in investigating processes such as cell motility.

Some work has also been performed to assess penetration depth of particles injected into skin using needle-free injection

Another promising direction was initiated by different groups to design and build portable hand-held SAM for subsurface diagnostics of soft and hard tissues and this direction currently in the commercialization process in clinical and cosmetology practice.

== See also ==
- Acoustic microscopy
