= Roman Maev =

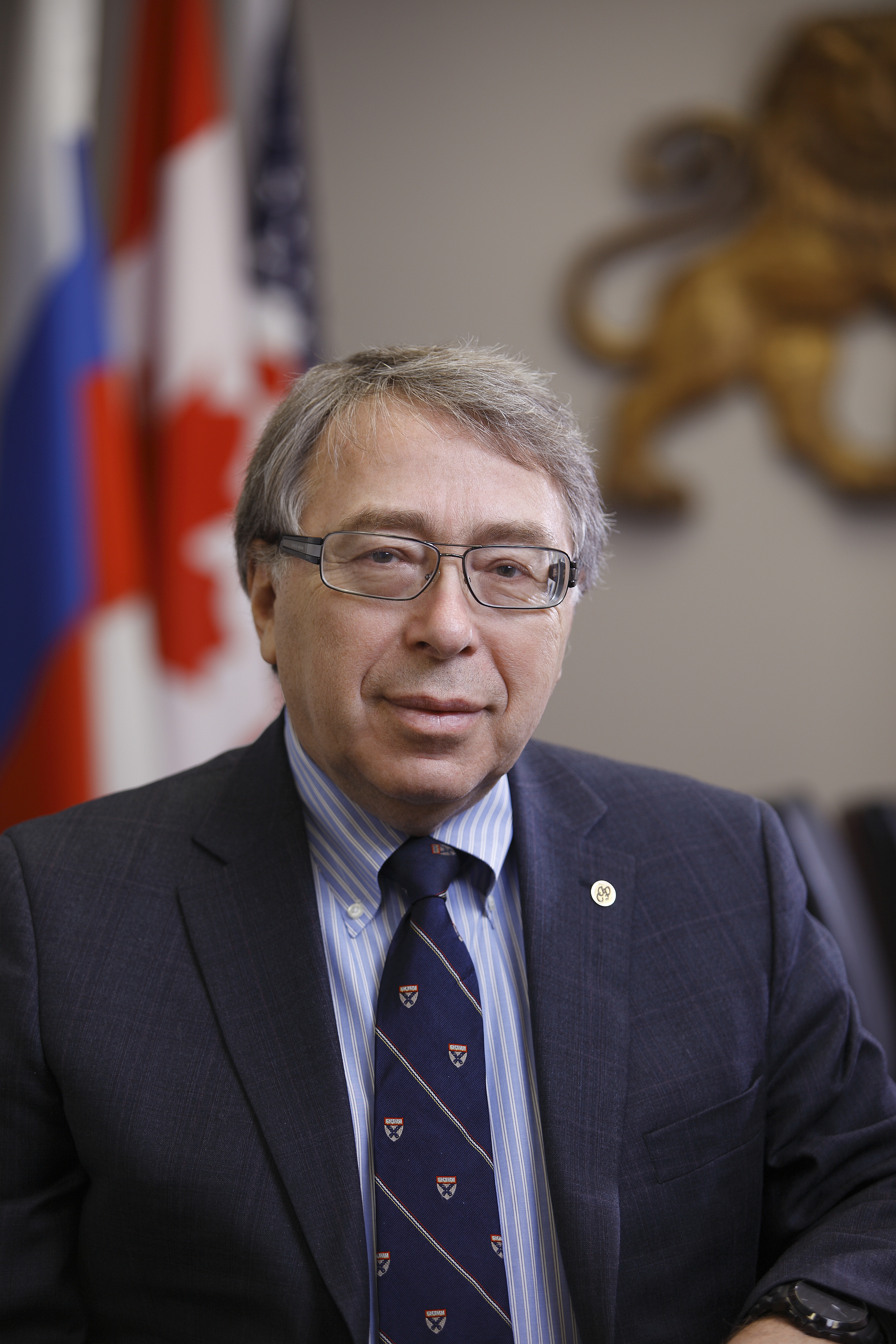
Roman Maev

Roman Grigorievich Maev (Russian: Роман Григорьевич Маев), is a Canadian physicist and professor at the University of Windsor (Windsor, Ontario). He is a foreign member of the Russian Academy of Sciences (2019). Maev is the founding director of the Institute for Diagnostic Imaging Research at the University of Windsor.

Maev is a Canadian solid-state physicist and educator whose work focuses on physical acoustics, ultrasonic and nonlinear acoustical imaging, nanostructured advanced materials and biomaterials, additive manufacturing, instrumentations for medical diagnostics, and art and culture heritage analysis.

Maev is also the founding President and CEO of Tessonics Group, a company which designs, develops and produces ultrasonic equipment for industrial and medical applications.

Since 2008, Maev has been serving as Honorary Consul of the Russian Federation in Windsor (Canada, Ontario).

== Early life and education ==
Maev earned his M.Sc. Degree with Red Diploma in theoretical nuclear physics from the National Research Nuclear University MEPhI (Moscow Engineering Physics Institute) in 1969. In 1972, he received recognition from the National Young Scientist Society for results in theoretical physics. In 1973, Maev received his Ph.D. in the theory of semiconductors from the P.N. Lebedev Physical Institute of the USSR Academy of Sciences. In 2002, Maev defended his Dr. Sci. Degree with the Title: “Methods of Acoustic Microscopy for Investigation of Microstructure, Physical and Chemical Properties of Materials” and received the corresponding diploma from the Russian Academy of Sciences. In 2005, the Russian Federation Government granted Maev with an official certificate of a full professorship in Physics in the field “Scientific Equipment and Methods for Experimental Physics”.

== Scientific and academic career ==
In 1978, Maev was appointed as head of the Laboratory for Biophysical Introscopy at the Institute of Chemical Physics of the USSR Academy of Sciences, and in 1984, he began to serve as acting chairholder of the Biomedical Physics Chair at the Moscow Institute of Physics and Technology. In 1987 he founded and directed the Acoustic Microscopy Center at the USSR Academy of Sciences. In 1990, he received a fellowship from the USA—USSR Gore-Chernomyrdin Commission, and as a result completed courses at the Harvard Business School in Boston, USA.

In 1994, Maev moved to Canada through an intergovernmental exchange program between Canada and Russia. In 1995, Maev was appointed a Full Faculty Professor in the Department of Physics at the University of Windsor (Windsor, Canada), and in 2002, he became a Chairholder of the DaimlerChrysler Industrial Research Chair. Maev has received over $30 million in funding from industrial partners and government agencies since starting his research in Canada in 1995. A $5.5 million NSERC grant supported a project, led by Maev at the IDIR, titled "Novel Quantitative Non-Destructive Quality Evaluation of Advance Joining and Consolidation Manufacturing Processes."

Maev currently serves as a member of the editorial advisory board of the ASNT Journal of Research in Non-destructive Evaluation of the BINDT Journal "Insight". He is a Fellow of IEEE, BINDT, CINDE, and RSNTTD. Maev has been on the Nano Ontario Board of Directors since 2012, and has participated in the organizing and program committees for international conferences, such as IEEE UFFC, SPIE Medical Imaging, NDE in Art Analyses, ASNT, CINDE, and RSNTTD

== Awards ==
Maev has been recognized professionally in the fields of physics and non-destructive testing.

In the late 1980s, he received awards related to his work in ultrasound and acoustic microscopy, including recognition from the American Institute of Ultrasound in Medicine and the World Microscopical Society.

In 2001, he received a Letter of Recognition for Research Excellence from the Deputy Prime Minister of Canada. He received awards for outstanding research and development from the DaimlerChrysler Corporation in the early 2000s.

In 2003, he received the Canada Innovation Summit Award for contributions to technical innovation. In 2007, he was awarded the Ontario Premier's Catalyst Award and the Canadian Association of Physicists Medal for Outstanding Achievement in Industrial and Applied Physics.

In 2010, he was elected as an IEEE Fellow and became a full member of the A. M. Prokhorov Russian Academy of Engineering Sciences.

In 2012, he received the Research Award for Sustained Excellence from the American Society for Non-destructive Testing.

In 2014, he co-authored a paper on imaging methods in the analysis of works of art, “A Review of Imaging Methods in Analysis of Works of Art: Thermographic Imaging Method in Art Analysis,” published in the Canadian Journal of Physics. He served as an IEEE Distinguished Lecturer in 2014 and 2015.

In 2019, he was elected to the Russian Academy of Sciences and received the title of Academician. In 2020, he received the American Society of Non-Destructive Testing's Mentoring Award. In 2024, he was awarded the Sokolov Award by the International Committee for Non-Destructive Testing and the American Society of Non-Destructive Testing's Robert C. McMaster Gold Medal Award.

Maev has received recognition from professional societies including organizations such as the British Institute of Non-Destructive Testing and the Canadian Institute for Non-Destructive Examination.

== Principal research contributions ==
In 1978, Maev was appointed as a head of the Laboratory of Biophysical Introscopy of the Institute of Chemical Physics of the Russian Academy of Sciences. In the early 1980s, a high-resolution (up to approximately 500 MHz) transmission-mode SAM, scanning acoustic microscopy, system was developed at the Laboratory of Biophysical Introscopy of the Russian Academy of Sciences under Maev and his research group, contributing to early developments in acoustic imaging techniques.

In 1980, Maev, together with A. Atalar (Stanford Univ.) and A. Briggs (Oxford Univ.) were invited as consultants to M. Hoppe’s group at the Ernst Leitz Wetzlar, GmbH (Germany) to assist in the development of an early commercial SAM system, ELSAM, with the broad frequency range from 100 MHz up to ultra high 1.8 GHz.

From 1984 to 1990, Maev with the colleagues from his lab developed the theory to determine the amplitude of acoustic waves occurring in transmission-mode acoustic microscopy and derived new quantitative amplitude-based methods for more accurate material characterization. During the same period his lab developed portable SAM systems which was implemented in a few research institutions in Russia, Ukraine, Latvia, China and Germany. Later, in 2001, Maev developed a handheld high-frequency (up to 100 MHz) ultrasonic imaging system for the characterization of subsurface and bulk structures of advanced materials, such as metals and alloys, ceramics, composites and polymers and, recently, for subsurface imaging of hard and soft tissues.

Over the course of his career, Maev has established an Acoustic Microscopy Center in Moscow and the Institute for Diagnostic Imaging Research in Windsor, Ontario.

== Publications and patents ==
As of 2022, Maev has published a total of 611 peer-reviewed items, including 27 books and chapters in books, 155 articles, 429 refereed conference proceedings, 63 patents issued and/or filed.
