= Abdullah Atalar =

Turkish scientist and academic (born 1954)

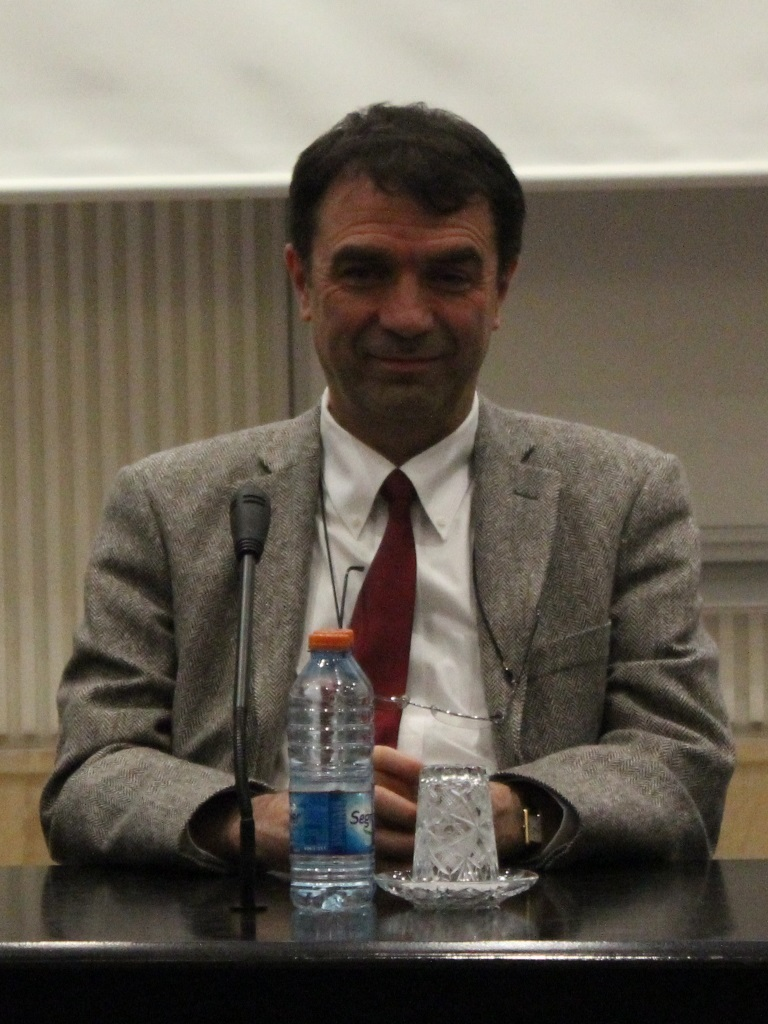
- Atalar in 2013
- Born: 11 April 1954; Gaziantep, Turkey
- Education: Middle East Technical University; Stanford University
- Known for: Acoustic microscopy
- Scientific career
- Fields: Electrical engineering
- Workplaces: Bilkent University
- Thesis: Acoustic reflection microscope (1978)
- Doctoral advisor: Calvin Quate
- Website: staff.bilkent.edu.tr/aatalar

Abdullah Atalar (born 11 April 1954) is a Turkish engineer and academician, who is a professor at Department of Electrical and Electronics Engineering at Bilkent University. From 2010 to 2022, he served as the rector of Bilkent University. He received B.S. degree from Middle East Technical University, in 1974, M.S. and Ph.D. degrees from Stanford University in 1976 and 1978, respectively, all in Electrical Engineering. His thesis work was on reflection acoustic microscopy.

Atalar is a member of Turkish Academy of Sciences, He was a member of Scientific and Technological Research Council (TÜBİTAK) science board (2004-2011), and chairman of the board of directors of TÜBİTAK Space (2004-2007) and TÜBİTAK Ulakbim (2004-2012). He is the chairman of the board of directors of Bilkent Holding, the endowment company owned wholly by Bilkent University. He is a recipient of TÜBİTAK's science award (1994). He is a fellow of the IEEE. He is married to Ayşe, granddaughter of İhsan Doğramacı, founder of İhsan Doğramacı Bilkent University. He has three sons.
