= Acoustic microscopy =

Magnified visualization through ultrasound

Acoustic microscopy is microscopy that employs very high or ultra high frequency ultrasound. Acoustic microscopes operate non-destructively and penetrate most solid materials to make visible images of internal features, including defects such as cracks, delaminations and voids.

== History ==
The notion of acoustic microscopy dates back to 1936 when S. Ya. Sokolov proposed a device for producing magnified views of structure with 3-GHz sound waves. However, due to technological limitations at the time, no such instrument could be constructed, and it was not until 1959 that Dunn and Fry performed the first acoustic microscopy experiments, though not at very high frequencies.

The scientific literature shows very little progress toward an acoustic microscope following the Dunn and Fry experiments up until about 1970 when two groups of activity emerged, one headed by C.F. Quate (Stanford University) and the other by A. Korpel and L.W. Kessler (Zenith Radio Research Labs). The first efforts to develop an operational acoustic microscope concentrated upon high-frequency adaptations of low-frequency ultrasonic visualization methods. One early system employed Bragg diffraction imaging, which is based upon direct interaction between an acoustic-wave field and a laser light beam. Another example was based on variations of the Pohlman cell. The original device is based upon a suspension of asymmetric particles in a thin fluid layer which, when acted upon by acoustic energy, produce visual reflectivity changes. Cunningham and Quate modified this by suspending tiny latex spheres in a fluid. Acoustic pressure caused population shifts which were visually detectable. Kessler and Sawyer developed a liquid crystal cell that enabled sound to be detected by hydrodynamic orientation of the fluid. In 1973, the Quate group began the development of a concept, which utilized the first scanning acoustic microscope (SAM) with a confocal pair of 50 MHz ultrasonic lenses for focusing and detecting the ultrasonic energy. In 1974, this concept was realized by R. A. Lemons and C. F. Quate at the Microwave Laboratory of Stanford University. Advancements of this instrument, a scanning acoustic microscope, have to do with achieving very high resolution, novel modes of imaging, and applications. The SAM was commercially introduced by Leitz Corp and by Olympus Corp. In 1970, the Korpel and Kessler group began to pursue a scanning laser detection system for acoustic microscopy. In 1974, the activity was shifted to another organization under Kessler (Sonoscan Inc), where practical aspects of the instrument were developed. This instrument, the scanning laser acoustic microscope (SLAM), was made commercial available in 1975.

In 1980, first high-resolution (with a frequency up to 500 MHz) through-transmission mode SAM was built by Roman Maev and his students at his Laboratory of Biophysical Introscopy of the Russian Academy of Sciences. First commercial SAM ELSAM with the broad frequency range from 100 MHz up to ultra high 1.8 GHz was built at the Ernst Leitz GmbH (Wetzlar, Germany) by the group led by Martin Hoppe and his consultants Abdullah Atalar (Stanford Univ., USA), Roman Maev (Russian Academy of Sciences, Russia).

At the same time, in 1984, Kessler's group completed development of the C-SAM concept instrument which operated in the reflection mode, as well as the through-transmission (only) mode of the SLAM. Using the same transducer to pulse ultrasound and receive the return echoes meant that the acoustic image could easily be constrained to a depth of interest. This design was the precursor of essentially all of the acoustic microscopes in use today, and was the development that made possible numerous later advances such as cross-sectional acoustic imaging, three-dimensional acoustic imaging, and others.

Since then, many improvements to acoustic microscopy systems have been made to enhance resolution, image quality and accuracy.

== Types of acoustic microscopes ==
In the half-century since the first experiments directly leading to the development of acoustic microscopes, at least three basic types of acoustic microscope have been developed. These are the scanning acoustic microscope (SAM), confocal scanning acoustic microscope (CSAM), and C-mode scanning acoustic microscope (C-SAM).

More recently acoustic microscopes based around picosecond ultrasonics systems have demonstrated acoustic imaging in cells using sub-optical wavelengths working with ultrasonic frequencies into the multi-GHz. Since the vast majority of acoustic microscopes in use today are C-SAM type instruments, this discussion will be limited to these instruments.

== Behavior of ultrasound in materials ==
Ultrasound is broadly defined as any sound having a frequency above 20 kHz, which is approximately the highest frequency that can be detected by the human ear. However, the acoustic microscopes emit ultrasound ranging from 5 MHz to beyond 400 MHz so that micrometre size resolution can be achieved. The ultrasound that penetrates a sample may be scattered, absorbed or reflected by the internal features or the material itself. These actions are analogous to the behavior of light. Ultrasound that is reflected from an internal feature, or (in some applications) that has traveled through the entire thickness of the sample, is used to make acoustic images.

== Sample types and preparation ==
Samples need no special treatment before acoustic imaging, but they should be able to withstand at least brief exposure to water or to another fluid, since air is a very poor transmitter of high frequency acoustic energy from the transducer. The sample may be completely immersed in the water, or scanned with a narrow stream of water. Alternately, alcohols and other fluids can be used so as to not contaminate the sample. Samples typically have at least one flat surface that can be scanned, although cylindrical and spherical samples can also be scanned with the proper fixtures. In the following paragraphs, the sample being described is a plastic-encapsulated integrated circuit.

== Ultrasonic frequencies ==
The ultrasonic frequencies pulsed into samples by the transducers of acoustic microscopes range from a low of 10 MHz (rarely, 5 MHz) to a high of 400 MHz or more. Across this spectrum of frequencies there is a trade-off of penetration and resolution. Ultrasound at low frequencies such as 10 MHz penetrates deeper into materials than ultrasound at higher frequencies, but the spatial resolution of the acoustic image is less. On the other hand, ultrasound at very high frequencies do not penetrate deeply, but provide acoustic images having very high resolution. The frequency chosen to image a particular sample will depend on the geometry of the part and on the materials involved.

The acoustic image of the plastic-encapsulated IC below was made using a 30 MHz transducer because this frequency provides a good compromise between penetration and image resolution.

== Scanning process ==
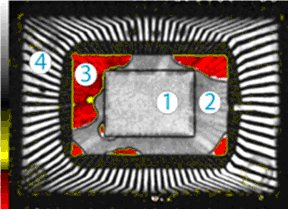
In the acoustic image ultrasound was pulsed through the black mold compound (plastic), and reflected from the interface between the overlying mold compound and the top surface of the silicon die, the top surface of the die paddle, delaminations (red) on top of the die paddle, and the outer portion (lead fingers) of the lead frame.

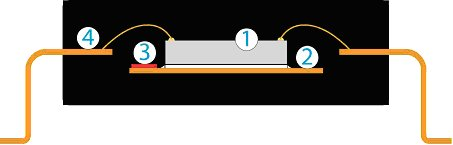
Side-view diagram

The ultrasonic transducer raster-scans the top surface of the sample. Several thousand pulses enter the sample each second. Each pulse may be scattered or absorbed in passing through homogeneous parts of the sample. At material interfaces, a portion of the pulse is reflected back to the transducer, where it is received and its amplitude recorded.

The portion of the pulse that is reflected is determined by the acoustic impedance, Z, of the each material that meets at the interface. The acoustic impedance of a given material is the material's density multiplied by the speed of ultrasound in that material. When a pulse of ultrasound encounters an interface between two materials, the degree of ultrasonic reflection from that interface is governed by this formula:

$$R = \frac{\left(z_2-z_1\right)}{\left(z_2+z_1\right)}$$

where R is the fraction of reflection, and z_{1} and z_{2} are the acoustic impedances of the two materials, analogous to refractive index in light propagation.

If both materials are typical solids, the degree of reflection will be moderate, and a significant portion of the pulse will travel deeper into the sample, where it may be in part reflected by deeper material interfaces. If one of the materials is a gas such as air – as in the case with delaminations, cracks and voids – the degree of reflection at the solid-to-gas interface is near 100%, the amplitude of the reflected pulse is very high, and practically none of the pulse travels deeper into the sample.

=== Gating of the return echoes ===
A pulse of ultrasound from the transducer travel nanoseconds or microseconds to reach an internal interface and are reflected back to the transducer. If there are several internal interfaces at different depths, the echoes arrive at the transducer at different times. Planar acoustic images do not often use all return echoes from all depths to make the visible acoustic image. Instead, a time window is created that accepts only those return echoes from the depth of interest. This process is known as "gating" the return echoes.

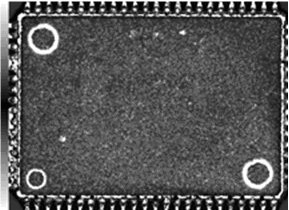
In the plastic-encapsulated IC, gating was on a depth that included the silicon die, the die paddle and the lead frame.

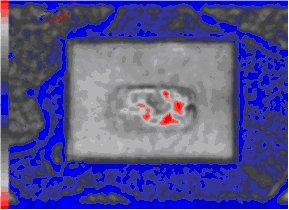
Still scanning the top of the sample, the gating of the return echoes was then changed to include only the plastic encapsulant (mold compound) above the die. The resulting acoustic image is shown above. It shows the structure of the particle-filled plastic mold compound, as well as the circular mold marks at the top surface of the component. The small white features are voids (trapped bubbles) in the mold compound. (These voids are also visible in the previous image as dark acoustic shadows.)

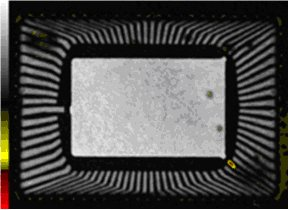
Gating was then changed to include only depth of the die attach material that attaches the silicon die to the die paddle. The die, the die paddle, and other features above and below the die attach depth are ignored. In the resulting acoustic, shown above slightly magnified, the red areas are voids (defects) in the die attach material.

Finally, the plastic-encapsulated IC was flipped over and imaged from the back side. The return echoes were gated on the depth where the backside mold compound interfaces with the back side of the die paddle. The small black dots in the acoustic image above are small voids (trapped bubbles) in the mold compound.

== Other image types ==
The acoustic images shown above are all planar images, so named because they make visible a horizontal plane within the sample. The acoustic data received in the return echo signals can also be used to make other types of images, including three-dimensional images, cross-sectional images, and thru-scan images.

== Range of applications ==
The samples imaged by acoustic microscopes are typically assemblies of one or more solid materials that have at least one surface that is either flat or regularly curved. The depth of interest may involve an internal bond between materials, or a depth at which a defect may occur in a homogeneous material. In addition, samples may be characterized without imaging to determine, e.g., their acoustic impedance.

Because of their ability to find visualize features non-destructively, acoustic microscopes are widely used in the production of electronic components and assemblies for quality control, reliability and failure analysis. Usually the interest is in finding and analyzing internal defects such as delaminations, cracks and voids, although an acoustic microscope may also be used simply to verify (by material characterization or imaging, or both) that a given part or a given material meets specifications or, in some instances, is not counterfeit. Acoustic microscopes are also used to image printed circuit boards and other assemblies.

In the semiconductor industry, acoustic microscopy is a standard method for evaluating the reliability of encapsulated components. The joint IPC/JEDEC standard J-STD-035 specifies procedures for detecting delaminations, cracks and voids in nonhermetic plastic-encapsulated components; it was first published in 1999 and revised as J-STD-035A in 2022. In this industry the instruments are also referred to as scanning acoustic tomographs (SAT), a term used by Hitachi for its FineSAT series. As devices have become smaller, multilayered and more densely mounted, and as wafer bonding has spread, inspection has extended from packaged parts to bonded 300 mm wafers, and fully automated in-line systems that load, inspect, judge and sort parts are used in volume production alongside laboratory instruments.

There are in addition numerous applications outside of electronics. In many industries, products that involve tubing, ceramic materials, composite materials or various types of bonded joints, including adhesive layers and different welds may be imaged acoustically.

The assembly of numerous medical products uses acoustic microscopes to investigate internal bonds and features. For example, a polymer film may be imaged to examine its bond to a multi-channel plastic plate used in blood analysis. SAM can provide data on the elasticity of cells and both, hard and soft tissues, which can give useful information on the physical forces holding structures in a particular shape and the mechanics of structures such as the cytoskeleton. These studies are particularly valuable in investigating processes such as cell motility.

Another program was initiated by various groups to design and build portable hand-held SAM for subsurface 3D imaging and diagnostics of soft and hard tissues. This approach is being developed with the goal of applying these methods to clinical and cosmetology practice.

Also during last decade was expressed an interest to apply acoustic microscopy methods for 3D non-invasive inspection of the paint layers of painted art and other art and culture heritage objects.

== See also ==
- Acoustic interferometer
- Scanning near-field ultrasound holography
- Ultrasound biomicroscopy
- Capacitive micromachined ultrasonic transducer
