= Russian Academy of Engineering =

Coordinates: 55.7109°N 37.5778°E

- Российская инженерная академия
- Founded: 1990
- Location: Moscow, Russia
- president: Boris Gusev (1990–current)
- Website: http://www.info-rae.ru/

The Russian Academy of Engineering (RAE) is a public academy of sciences, which unites leading Russian and foreign scientists, engineers, scientific-research organizations, higher educational institutions and enterprises. The Russian Academy of Engineering is the legal successor of the Engineering Academy of the USSR.

== Mission ==
- uniting creative potential of Russian scientists and engineers;
- development and efficient implementation of intellectual potential in the field of engineering activities;
- development and accompanying in carrying out the most important and prospective research and innovation programmes;
- creation and application of principally new types of technics, technologies and materials;
- providing acceleration of scientific-technical progress on the key directions of development of the Russian economy.

== Activity ==
The Russian Academy of Engineering (RAE) includes 28 sections, which cover the key branches of industry, and a range of councils on various scientific-technical issues.

In December 2020 the RAE Chinese Centre has been opened in Beijing in the framework of joint meeting of the RAE Presidium and the branch of the Chinese Academy of Engineering.
