= Index of physics articles (W) =

The index of physics articles is split into multiple pages due to its size.

To navigate by individual letter use the table of contents below.

== W ==
- W' and Z' bosons
- W' boson
- W. G. Unruh
- W. Jason Morgan
- W. Lewis Hyde
- W. R. Dean
- W. W. Hansen
- WAMIT
- WASH-1400
- WASH-740
- WAsP
- WIMP Argon Programme
- WITCH experiment
- WKB approximation
- WMAP cold spot
- WOMBAT (diffractometer)
- W and Z bosons
- W band
- W state
- Wade Allison
- Wafer (electronics)
- Wagner model
- Wake
- Wake turbulence
- Waldo K. Lyon
- Wall-plug efficiency
- Wallace Clement Sabine
- Wallace Hampton Tucker
- Wallace Smith Broecker
- Walter A. Rosenblith
- Walter Dieminger
- Walter Dornberger
- Walter Eric Spear
- Walter Franz
- Walter Gear
- Walter Gerlach
- Walter Gilbert
- Walter Gordon (physicist)
- Walter Grotrian
- Walter Guyton Cady
- Walter H. Schottky
- Walter Heitler
- Walter Herrmann (physicist)
- Walter Hoppe
- Walter Houser Brattain
- Walter Kaufmann (physicist)
- Walter Kistler
- Walter Kohn
- Walter M. Elsasser
- Walter Mauderli
- Walter Oelert
- Walter Rogowski
- Walter Rotman
- Walter Schottky Prize
- Walter Selke
- Walter Thirring
- Walter Tollmien
- Walter Zinn
- Walter Zürn
- Walter de Heer
- Walther Bothe
- Walther Kossel
- Walther Meissner
- Walther Müller
- Walther Nernst
- Walther Ritz
- Wander Johannes de Haas
- Wang Ganchang
- Wang Zhuxi
- Wannier function
- Ward Plummer
- Wardenclyffe Tower
- Ward–Takahashi identity
- Warm dark matter
- Warm–hot intergalactic medium
- Warp drive (Star Trek)
- Warped Passages
- Warped geometry
- Warren J. Smith
- Warren Siegel
- Washburn's equation
- Washburn constant
- Washington Large Area Time Coincidence Array
- Washout (aviation)
- Water content
- Water cycle
- Water meter
- Water pipe percolator
- Water potential
- Water retention curve
- Water thread experiment
- Water vapor
- Water window
- Watercraft
- Waterfall plot
- Waterhole (radio)
- Waterspout
- Watson interferometer
- Watt
- Watt's law
- Watt W. Webb
- Watt steam engine
- Wave
- Wave-icle
- Wave-making resistance
- Wave-piercing
- WaveRider
- Wave Motion (journal)
- Wave action (continuum mechanics)
- Wave base
- Wave drag
- Wave equation
- Wave field synthesis
- Wave flume
- Wave function
- Wave function collapse
- Wave function renormalization
- Wave height
- Wave impedance
- Wave loading
- Wave packet
- Wave power
- Wave propagation
- Wave propagation speed
- Wave radar
- Wave setup
- Wave shoaling
- Wave tank
- Wave theory of light
- Wave turbulence
- Wave vector
- Waveguide
- Waveguide (acoustics)
- Waveguide (electromagnetism)
- Waveguide (optics)
- Waveguiding
- Wavelength
- Wavenumber
- Wavenumber–frequency diagram
- Waveplate
- Waves and shallow water
- Wave–current interaction
- Wave–particle duality
- Weak-field approximation
- Weak focusing
- Weak hypercharge
- Weak interaction
- Weak isospin
- Weak isospin projection
- Weak localization
- Weakless Universe
- Weakly guiding fiber
- Weakly interacting massive particles
- Weapons-grade
- Web of Knowledge
- Web of Science
- Weber (unit)
- Weber bar
- Weber electrodynamics
- Weber number
- Wedge (mechanical device)
- Wedge filter
- Wedge fringe
- Wehnelt cylinder
- Wei-Tou Ni
- Wei Shyy
- Weibel instability
- Weight
- Weighted Voronoi diagram
- Weighting curve
- Weightlessness
- Weinberg angle
- Weinberg–Witten theorem
- Weinstein conjecture
- Weir
- Weiss domain
- Weiss magneton
- Weissenberg effect
- Weissenberg number
- Welteislehre
- Wendell H. Furry
- Wendelstein 7-X
- Werner Hartmann (physicist)
- Werner Heisenberg
- Werner Israel
- Werner Kolhörster
- Werner Kuhn (chemist)
- Werner Meyer-Eppler
- Werner Rolfinck
- Werner state
- Wernher von Braun
- Werthamer–Helfand–Hohenberg theory
- Wesley Huntress
- Wess–Zumino gauge
- Wess–Zumino model
- Wess–Zumino–Witten model
- West number
- Wet-bulb temperature
- Wetted aspect ratio (wing)
- Wetting
- Wetting transition
- Weyl's postulate
- Weyl curvature hypothesis
- Weyl equation
- Weyl notation
- Weyl scalar
- Weyl tensor
- Weyl transformation
- What Do You Care What Other People Think?
- What Is Life?
- What the Bleep Do We Know!?
- Wheatstone bridge
- Wheel and axle
- Wheeler's delayed choice experiment
- Wheeler–DeWitt equation
- Wheeler–Feynman absorber theory
- Whirlpool
- Whirlwind (atmospheric phenomenon)
- Whispering-gallery wave
- Whispering gallery
- White dwarf
- White hole
- White noise
- Whitehead's theory of gravitation
- Whitham equation
- Whole number rule
- Wick's theorem
- Wick Haxton
- Wick rotation
- Wide-angle X-ray scattering
- Wide-bandgap semiconductors
- Wideband materials
- Widom scaling
- Wiedemann–Franz law
- Wien's displacement law
- Wien's distribution law
- Wien approximation
- Wien effect
- Wien filter
- Wiggler (synchrotron)
- Wightman axioms
- Wigner's classification
- Wigner's friend
- Wigner's theorem
- Wigner 3-j symbols
- Wigner crystal
- Wigner effect
- Wigner quasiprobability distribution
- Wigner–Eckart theorem
- Wigner–Seitz cell
- Wigner–Seitz radius
- Wilbur B. Rayton
- Wilfrid Basil Mann
- Wilhelm Anderson
- Wilhelm Eduard Weber
- Wilhelm Hallwachs
- Wilhelm Hanle
- Wilhelm Holtz
- Wilhelm Karl Ritter von Haidinger
- Wilhelm Lenz
- Wilhelm Nusselt
- Wilhelm Orthmann
- Wilhelm Röntgen
- Wilhelm Walcher
- Wilhelm Westphal
- Wilhelm Wien
- Wilkinson Microwave Anisotropy Probe
- Willard Boyle
- Willard Harrison Bennett
- Willebrord Snellius
- Willem 's Gravesande
- Willem Hendrik Keesom
- Willem Vos
- Willem de Sitter
- Willi Kalender
- William A. Bardeen
- William Alfred Fowler
- William Allen Zajc
- William Allis
- William Andrew Goddard III
- William Arnold Anthony
- William Astbury
- William B. Bridges
- William B. McLean
- William Bassichis
- William C. Schwartz
- William Coblentz
- William Cochran (physicist)
- William Crookes
- William Curry (oceanographer)
- William D. Coolidge
- William Daniel Phillips
- William Duane (physicist)
- William E. Caswell
- William E. Forsythe
- William E. Gordon
- William Eccles (physicist)
- William Edward Ayrton
- William Fletcher Barrett
- William Francis Gray Swann
- William Francis Magie
- William Frederick Meggers
- William Froude
- William Fuller Brown, Jr.
- William G. Tifft
- William Gilbert (astronomer)
- William Grylls Adams
- William Hallock
- William Henry Bragg
- William Higinbotham
- William Hyde Wollaston
- William J. Thaler
- William Jackson Humphreys
- William John Macquorn Rankine
- William Jones (optician)
- William Justin Kroll
- William L. Burke
- William Lawrence Bragg
- William M. Hartmann
- William McFadden Orr
- William Mitchell (physicist)
- William Mitchinson Hicks
- William Morris Kinnersley
- William Nicol (geologist)
- William Nierenberg
- William P. Winfree
- William Penney, Baron Penney
- William Prager
- William R. Bennett, Jr.
- William R. Kanne
- William Rarita
- William Richard Peltier
- William Ritchie (physicist)
- William Rowan Hamilton
- William Shockley
- William Stanley, Jr.
- William Sturgeon
- William Sutherland (physicist)
- William Thomson, 1st Baron Kelvin
- William Vermillion Houston
- William Watson (scientist)
- William Wootters
- William Zisman
- Willibald Jentschke
- Willis Lamb
- Williwaw
- Willy Fischler
- Willy Ley
- Wilson loop
- Wimshurst machine
- Wind
- WindPRO
- WindShear
- Wind Shear's Full Scale, Rolling Road, Automotive Wind Tunnel
- Wind chill
- Wind energy
- Wind energy software
- Wind farm
- Wind generator
- Wind gradient
- Wind power
- Wind power forecasting
- Wind resource assessment
- Wind shear
- Wind speed
- Wind stress
- Wind tunnel
- Wind turbine
- Wind turbine aerodynamics
- Wind wave
- Wind wave model
- Windage
- Windbelt
- Windhexe
- Windographer
- Windrow
- Windward and leeward
- Winfried Otto Schumann
- Wing
- Wing-shape optimization
- Wing configuration
- Wing fence
- Wing loading
- Wing twist
- Wing warping
- Wingspan
- Wingsuit flying
- Wingtip device
- Wingtip vortices
- Winston E. Kock
- Winston H. Bostick
- Wire chamber
- Wireless energy transfer
- Wireless telegraphy
- Wiswesser's rule
- Witelo
- Witold Milewski (mathematician)
- Witold Nazarewicz
- Witten index
- Wlodzimierz Klonowski
- Wojciech H. Zurek
- Wojciech Rubinowicz
- Wojciech Świętosławski
- Woldemar Voigt
- Wolf Prize in Physics
- Wolf effect
- Wolf summation
- Wolff algorithm
- Wolfgang Demtröder
- Wolfgang Eisenmenger (physicist)
- Wolfgang Finkelnburg
- Wolfgang Gentner
- Wolfgang Haack
- Wolfgang K. H. Panofsky
- Wolfgang Ketterle
- Wolfgang Ludwig Krafft
- Wolfgang Paul
- Wolfgang Pauli
- Wolfgang Rindler
- Wolfgang Smith
- Wollaston landscape lens
- Wollaston prism
- Wolter telescope
- Womersley number
- Woo Chia-wei
- Woodruff T. Sullivan III
- Woodstock of physics
- Woods–Saxon potential
- Work (electrical)
- Work (physics)
- Work (thermodynamics)
- Work function
- Work output
- Working Group on Women in Physics
- World Data Center
- World Magnetic Model
- World Year of Physics 2005
- World crystal
- World line
- Worldsheet
- Worm-like chain
- Wormhole
- Wow! signal
- Wright brothers
- Wrinkles in Time
- Wu Youxun
- Wubbo Ockels
- Wurtzite crystal structure
- Wu–Yang monopole
- Wyckoff positions
- Wyld diagrams
- Władysław Natanson
- Władysław Turowicz
- Włodzimierz Trzebiatowski
- Włodzimierz Trzebiatowski Institute of Low Temperature and Structure Research
