= Heat pump (disambiguation) =

A heat pump is a device used to warm and sometimes also cool buildings by transferring thermal energy.

Types of heat pumps used for buildings include:

- Air source heat pump
- Exhaust air heat pump
- Ground source heat pump (or geothermal heat pump)
- Solar-assisted heat pump

Home appliances that incorporate heat pumps, or work on similar principals, include:

- Air conditioner
- Dehumidifier
- Refrigerator

Electric vehicles often incorporate heat pumps to help manage battery and passenger cabin temperatures.

Heat pump may also refer to:

- Absorption heat pump
- Absorption-compression heat pump
- Direct exchange geothermal heat pump
- Heat pump and refrigeration cycle
  - Hot air engine

== See also ==
- District heating
  - Drammen Heat Pump
- Magnetic refrigeration
- Stirling engine
- Thermoacoustic heat engine
- Thermoelectric cooling (or Peltier heat pump)
- Vortex tube
