= Thomas A. Darden =

American mathematical statistician and biophysicist

Thomas Appleton Darden
- Born: December 2, 1948 (age 77); Denver, Colorado, U.S.
- Education: University of New Mexico (B.S.); University of Chicago (M.S.); University of California, Berkeley (Ph.D.)
- Known for: Particle mesh Ewald method
- Scientific career
- Fields: Mathematical statistics; Biophysics; Computational chemistry
- Workplaces: National Institute of Environmental Health Sciences; University of Maryland, College Park; University of Wisconsin–Madison; OpenEye Scientific Software
- Doctoral advisor: Jerzy Neyman

Thomas Appleton Darden (born December 2, 1948) is an American distinguished mathematical statistician and biophysicist known for his contributions to computational chemistry and molecular dynamics. He is best known as co-developer of the particle mesh Ewald (PME) method, a fast algorithm for calculating long-range electrostatic interactions in molecular simulations, which became a cornerstone of modern molecular dynamics software such as AMBER, CHARMM, and GROMACS. He has an h-index of over 77 and his publications have been cited more than 100,000 times.

== Early life and education ==
Darden was born in Denver, Colorado, on December 2, 1948. He earned his Bachelor of Science degree in mathematics from the University of New Mexico in 1970, followed by a Master of Science in mathematics from the University of Chicago in 1971. He completed his Ph.D. in statistics at the University of California, Berkeley, in 1978. His dissertation, supervised by Jerzy Neyman, titled A pseudo-steady state approximation for stochastic enzyme kinetics, examined stochastic models in enzyme kinetics.

== Career ==
Following postdoctoral and teaching appointments at the University of Maryland, College Park, and the University of Wisconsin–Madison, Darden joined the National Institute of Environmental Health Sciences (NIEHS) in 1981 as a staff fellow and later became a mathematical statistician. His research at NIEHS focused on the application of molecular modeling and computational methods to problems in human health, including studies of proteins, nucleic acids, and receptor ligands.

In 2008, he joined OpenEye, now Cadence, in Santa Fe, New Mexico.

== Research and impact ==
In the early 1990s, Darden collaborated closely with chemist Lee G. Pedersen at UNC–Chapel Hill and Darrin M. York, then Pedersen's graduate student, to address a long-standing computational challenge in molecular dynamics: how to treat electrostatics both accurately and efficiently. The emerging algorithm, known as the particle mesh Ewald (PME) method, introduced a fast Fourier transform (FFT)-based approach that dramatically improved the speed and precision of Ewald summations used in modeling long-range electrostatic interactions.

The first PME paper, published in 1993 in The Journal of Chemical Physics, presented a scalable N·log(N) method for large systems, followed by a refined “smooth PME” algorithm in 1995. Together, these works revolutionized molecular simulation techniques and became foundational to software packages such as AMBER, CHARMM, NAMD, and GROMACS. As of 2025, the two PME papers have been cited more than 50,000 times on Google Scholar, making them among the most influential publications in computational chemistry.

Beyond PME, Darden has contributed to the development of numerical methods for analyzing molecular dynamics trajectories, efficient algorithms for electrostatic calculations, and graphical techniques for molecular representation. His collaborative work has extended to structural modeling of proteins such as HIV-1 protease, cytochrome P450 enzymes, and blood coagulation factors, as well as studies in quantum mechanical modeling and stochastic population genetics.

== Awards and honors ==
- Phi Beta Kappa, University of New Mexico (1970)
- National Science Foundation Graduate Fellowship, University of Chicago (1970–1972)
- Evelyn Fix Memorial Dissertation Prize, University of California, Berkeley (1978)
- NIEHS Award of Scientific Merit (1995, 1998)

== Selected publications ==
- Darden, T. A.; York, D. M.; Pedersen, L. G. (1993). "Particle mesh Ewald: An N·log(N) method for Ewald sums in large systems". Journal of Chemical Physics. 98 (12): 10089–10092. doi:10.1063/1.464397.
- Essmann, U.; Darden, T. A.; Lee, H.; Perera, L.; Berkowitz, M. L.; Pedersen, L. G. (1995). "A smooth particle mesh Ewald method". Journal of Chemical Physics. 103 (19): 8577–8593. doi:10.1063/1.470117.
- Sagui, C.; Darden, T. A. (1999). "Molecular dynamics simulations of biomolecules: Long-range electrostatic effects". Annual Review of Biophysics and Biomolecular Structure. 28: 155–179.
