= Ernie Tuck =

Australian mathematician

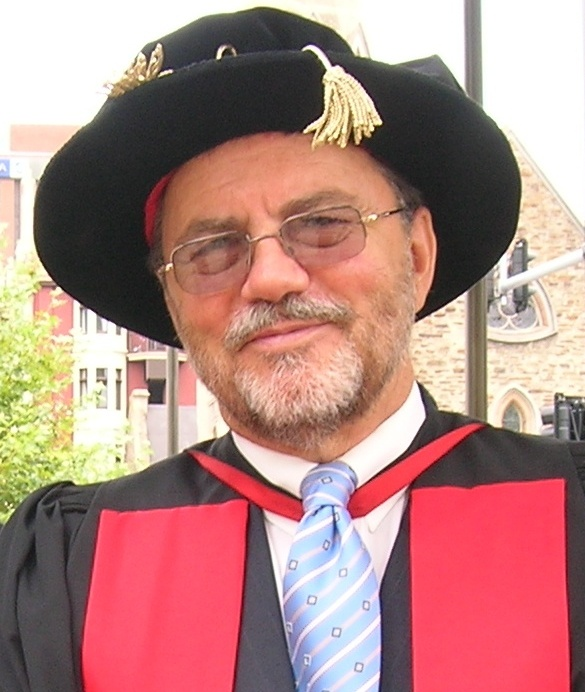
- Born: 1 June 1939; Adelaide, South Australia
- Died: 11 March 2009 (aged 69); Adelaide, South Australia
- Education: University of Adelaide; Cambridge University
- Known for: Tuck's incompressibility function Tuck Fellowship; Ship Motion Program
- Awards: Georg Weinblum Lectureship (1990); Thomas Ranken Lyle Medal (1999); ANZIAM Medal (1999)
- Scientific career
- Fields: Applied mathematics
- Workplaces: The University of Adelaide
- Doctoral advisor: Fritz Ursell

Ernest Oliver Tuck was an Australian applied mathematician. His work was primarily in fluid mechanics, and he is known for the Tuck's incompressibility function.

== Early life and education ==
Tuck was born on 1 June 1939 in Adelaide, South Australia. He studied Applied Mathematics for his undergraduate degree at the University of Adelaide, where he was mentored by Professor R. B. Potts and obtained a First Class Honours Degree in 1960. He won a Legacy Scholarship to work on a PhD at Cambridge University where he was advised by Fritz Ursell. His PhD thesis was on the application of slender-body theory to ships. In it, he made a revolutionary approach of using matched asymptotic expansions in order to predict the wave resistance of a slender ship. He defended his dissertation in 1963 titled "The steady motion of a slender ship."

== Career ==
In 1963 Tuck went to the United States to work with Francis Ogilvie and John Nicholas Newman at the David Taylor Model Basin, and subsequently with Ted Wu at Caltech.

In 1967, Tuck returned to Adelaide University as a reader in applied mathematics and was subsequently appointed Elder Professor of Mathematics. Tuck was promoted to a personal chair in 1974. After Ren Potts retired in 1990, Tuck became the Chair of Applied Mathematics as well as the Elder Professor of Applied Mathematics. While in the applied mathematics department he was often the head of the department. Between 1993 and 1996, he was also the dean of the Faculty of Mathematical and Computer Sciences. He retired in June 2002 and was granted the title professor emeritus. While at Adelaide, he had 25 PhD students and 4 Masters students.

From 1984 to 1992 he served as Editor of Series B (Applied Mathematics) of the Journal of the Australian Mathematical Society. In 1992 he established TeXAdel, an organization responsible for automating the production of the AMS journals. He served as president of the IUTAM Congress in 2008. He has been a visiting professor at Caltech, Stanford, the University of Michigan, and MIT.

== Research ==
Tuck primarily worked in fluid mechanics. His work spanned ship hydrodynamics, aerodynamics, acoustics, bio-fluid mechanics, hydraulics, and numerical analysis. He also published papers in games theory. Apart from applied mathematics, in his later years he also worked on problems in pure mathematics related to Riemann hypothesis and properties of the zeta function.

== Awards and honors ==
In 1959, Tuck was Awarded the Sir John Gellibrand Scholarship. In 1988, he was elected to be a part of the Australian Academy of Science. In 1996, he also elected to be a fellow of the Australian Academy of Technological Sciences and Engineering. Being a fellow of both of these academies is rare feat.

Tuck was chosen to be the Georg Weinblum Memorial Lecturer for 1990-1991. In 1999, Tuck received the Thomas Ranken Lyle Medal from the Australian Academy of Science and the ANZIAM Medal by the Australian and New Zealand Industrial and Applied Mathematics (ANZIAM) society. The Australian Government awarded Tuck the Centenary Medal in 2001.

== Personal life ==
Tuck is survived by wife Helen (née Wood), two sons Warren and Geoff, and their grandchildren.

== Selected works ==
He published over 180 papers covering a wide range of topics.
