= Wind shear (disambiguation) =

Wind shear is a difference in wind speed and direction over a relatively short distance in the atmosphere.

It may also refer to:

- Windshear (comics), a Marvel Comics character
- Windshear, child of Bulletman and Bulletgirl
- Wind Shear's Full Scale, Rolling Road, Automotive Wind Tunnel

== See also ==
- Wind Sheer, a transformer
