= Ranque =

Ranque is a French surname. Notable people with the surname include:

- Denis Ranque (born 1952), French engineer and businessman
- Georges J. Ranque (1898–1973), French inventor
