= Absorption–compression heat pump =

Type of heat pump

An absorption–compression heat pump (ACHP), also sometimes called compression–absorption heat pump, is a device that integrates an electric compressor in an absorption heat pump. In some cases this is obtained by combining a vapor-compression heat pump and an absorption heat pump. It is also referred to as a hybrid heat pump which is however a broader field. Thanks to this integration, the device can obtain cooling and heating effects using both thermal and electrical energy sources. This type of systems is well coupled with cogeneration systems where both heat and electricity are produced. Depending on the configuration, the system can maximize heating and cooling production from a given amount of fuel, or can improve the temperature (hence the quality) of waste heat from other processes. This second use is the most studied one and has been applied to several industrial applications.

== History ==
1748
The first absorption–compression heat pump cycle concept was patented by Osenbrück. Little research on it was done in the following years.
1950-1951
Altenkirch performed a detailed theoretical study identifying the cycle as having a significant energy saving potential.
1970-2000
With the oil crisis in the 70s, the energy saving potential of the cycle grew in interest and there was a rapid increase in research activities in the field. In this period several experimental plants were built and in 1997, Groll summarized this activities in its review where he identified more than 40 studies. At that time, considerable work was still needed before the ACHP could become commercially available.
2011
Nordtvedt studied the cycle in his doctoral thesis and his studies ended up in the construction, in 2011, of the first commercial application in the Norwegian Food Industry. After this, several units have been installed for commercial use in various high temperature industrial applications.

== Advantages and drawbacks ==
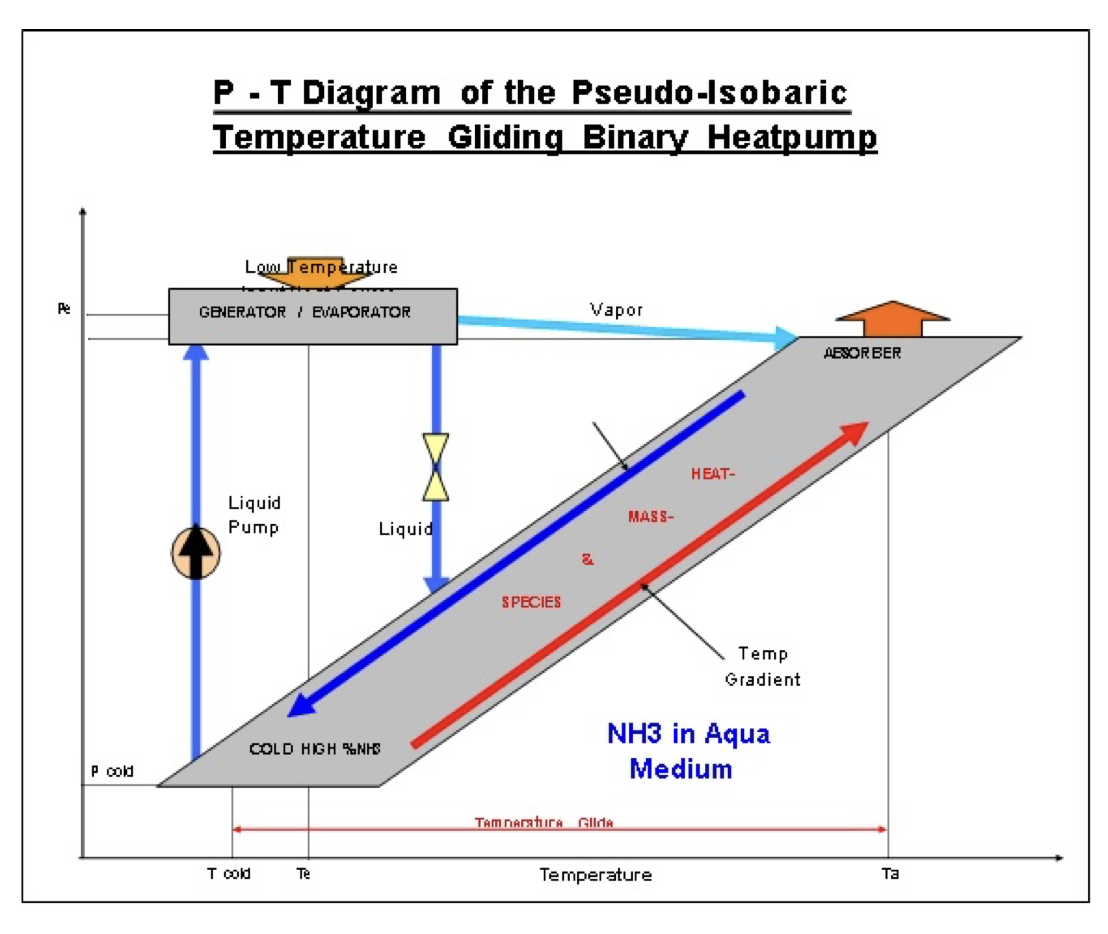
P-T Diagram showing the temperature gliding in binary heat pump. This behaviour increase the efficiency of ACHP

Ammonia toxicity is the main drawback of ACHP

The main advantage with respect to compression heat pump is that the compression–absorption heat pumps allow the heat to be transfer with a temperature glide. The compression heat pump uses a single pure working fluid, hence exchanges heat at a constant temperature. The absorption–compression heat pump uses instead a binary mixture where the condensation and evaporation occur with a temperature glide. This property increases the efficiency of the heat transfer when the heat source also has a significant temperature glide, which is the typical condition found when dealing with waste heat recovery.

Being a hybrid solution that can exploit both heat and mechanical/electric energy sources, the device can be perfectly coupled with cogeneration units to produce heating and cooling at very high efficiencies. Moreover, it makes the system more flexible, allowing the optimization of the mix of electricity and thermal energy. Their availability vary in fact along the day and the year. Therefore the flexibility allow to reduce the operating costs.

The main drawback of this technology is that, to achieve good performances, they typically need to employ ammonia, which is very toxic and flammable. This drawback resulted in the fact that these applications remained limited to the industrial sector, where it is more practical dealing with dangerous fluids.

== Configurations ==
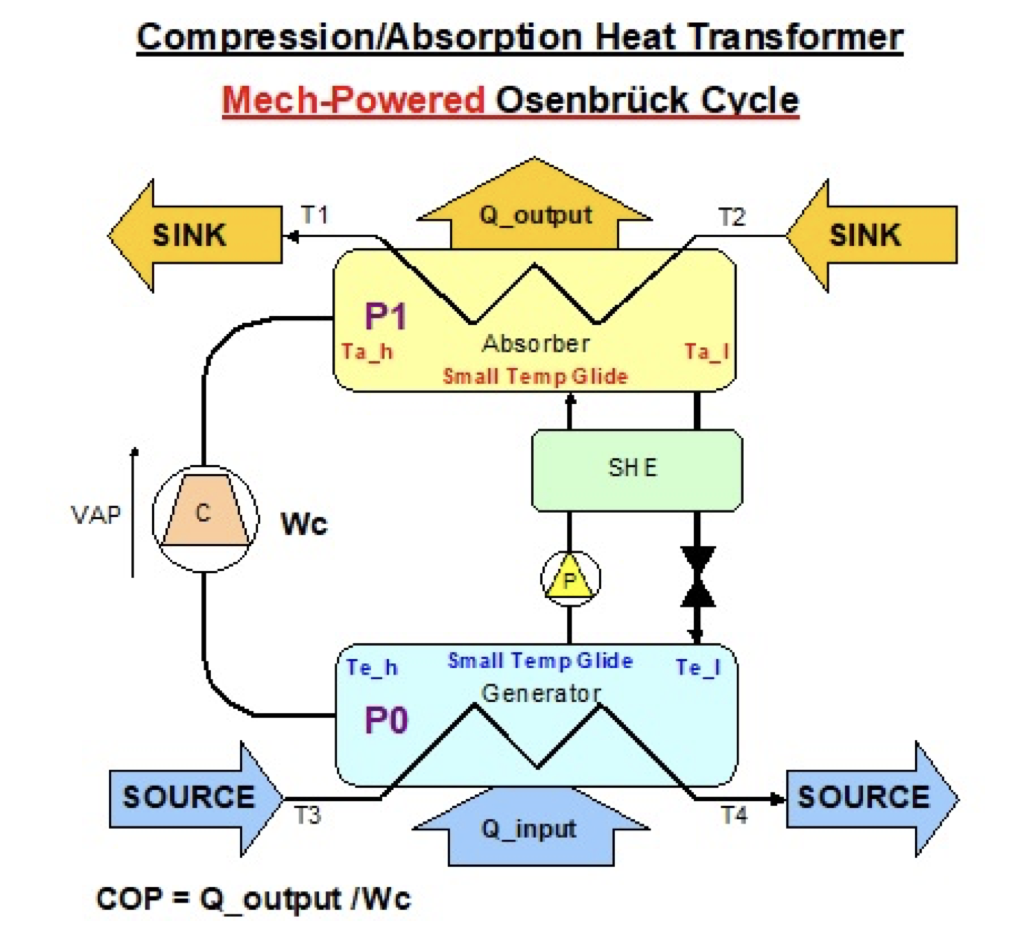
Conceptual scheme of combined absorption and vapour compression heat pump with compressor in parallel to the absorption cycle pump also known as Osenbrück cycle

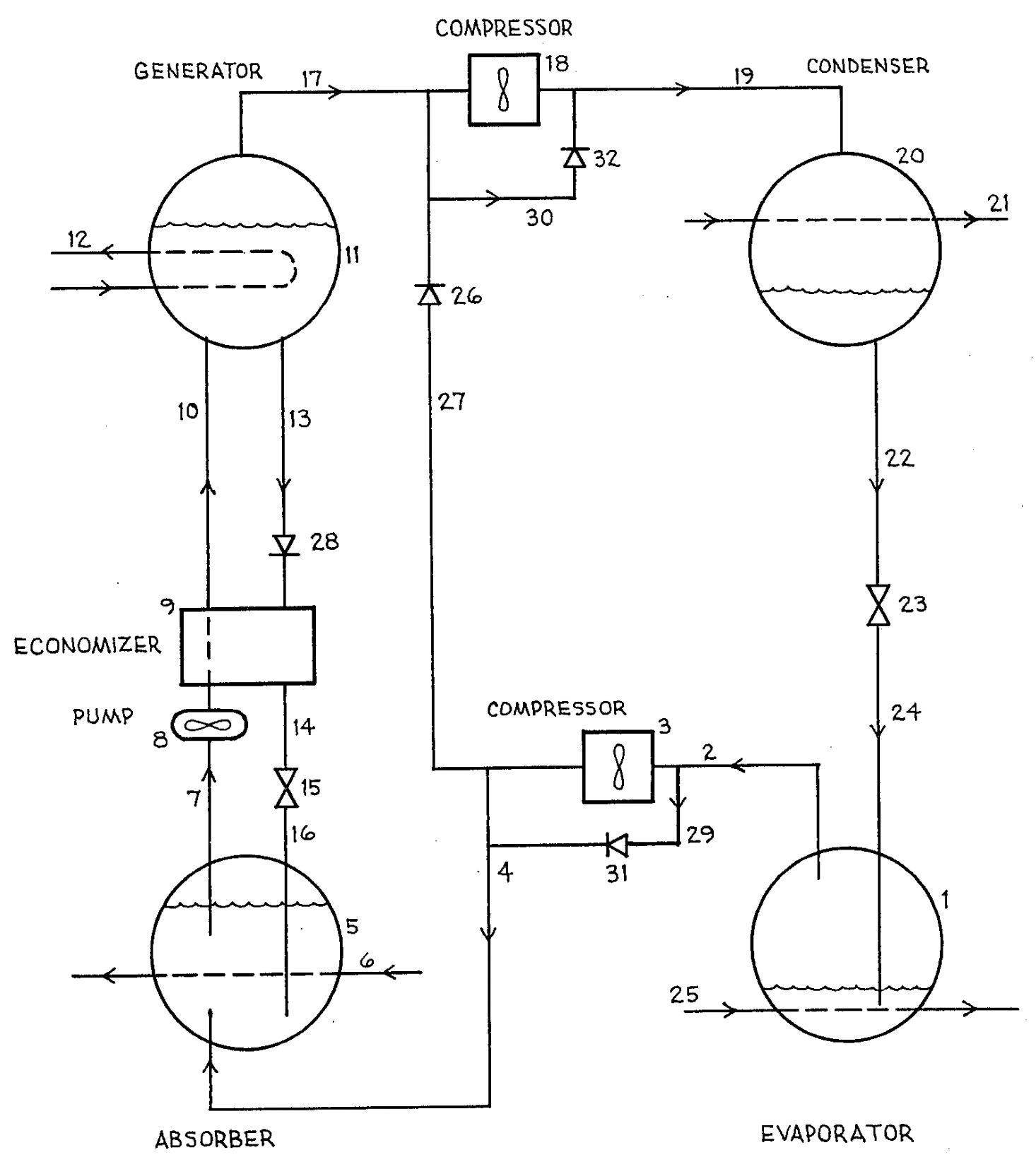
Conceptual scheme of a combined absorption and vapour compression refrigeration system where the two cycles share the condenser, lamination valve and evaporation part of the cycle

The most studied configuration is the so-called compression heat pump with solution cycle (CHPS) or compression resorption heat pump (CRHP), where the compressor is in parallel to the electric pump located between the absorber and the desorber. This configuration is used to increase the temperature of waste heat since it allow high absorption temperature at lower pressure than compression heat pumps.

Another possible configuration for the absorption–compression heat pump is obtained from the combination of a gas-driven absorption heat pump (GAHP) with a vapor-compression heat pump. This configuration arises from the consideration that both cycles have in common a condenser, a lamination valve, and an evaporator. The main difference between the two is in the compression phase: where the compression heat pump uses an electric compressor, the gas-driven absorption heat pump uses a thermal compressor. The ACHP is obtained by combining the components that are in common and using the electric and thermal compressor in parallel or in series.

== Fluids selection ==
Compression heat pumps use only a single fluid which is a refrigerant. In contrast, absorption heat pump requires two fluids, a refrigerant and an absorbent able to absorb it. By combining the two devices, proper refrigerant absorbent pairs compatible with both the cycles are needed.

=== Refrigerants ===
There is a wide choice of refrigerants available for compression heat pumps. The absorption cycle is the one limiting the choice of the refrigerant. The most common refrigerants for absorption systems are ammonia and water. Both are good for combined absorption–compression heat pumps.

Ammonia has an exceptionally good solubility in water. This is an important aspect that increases the performance and decreases the size of the device. However, its high toxicity and flammability reduces its attractiveness.

Water is a very attractive refrigerant because it is abundant, non-toxic, non-flammable and highly soluble in lithium bromide (LiBr). The main issue with water is that, at the typical heat pump evaporator pressures, it freezes at 0 °C. This makes water unsuitable for the applications where the cold sink goes below 0 °C, which is the typical winter operating condition of an air source heat pump.

=== Absorbents ===
The absorbent and refrigerant are strictly related to each other. In the case that ammonia is used as refrigerant, the most common absorbent is water. In the case that water is used as refrigerant, as previously mentioned, the absorbent is usually LiBr.

Ionic liquids have also been proposed as good absorbents, especially for water as refrigerant. The main advantages of these salts is that they can be used under the conditions at which LiBr solution runs the risk of crystallization, and they are less corrosive.

== See also ==
- Absorption heat pump
- Heat pump
- Vapor-compression refrigeration
