= Vortex tube =

Device for separating compressed gas into hot and cold streams

Separation of a compressed gas into a hot stream and a cold stream

The vortex tube, also known as the Ranque–Hilsch vortex tube, is a mechanical device that separates a compressed gas into hot and cold streams. The gas emerging from the hot end can reach temperatures of 200 °C (390 °F), and the gas emerging from the cold end can reach −50 °C (−60 °F). It has no moving parts, but has poor energy efficiency.

Pressurised gas is injected tangentially into a swirl chamber near one end of a tube, leading to a rapid rotation—the first vortex—as it moves along the inner surface of the tube to the far end. A conical nozzle allows gas specifically from this outer layer to escape at that end through a valve. The remainder of the gas is forced to return in an inner vortex of reduced diameter within the outer vortex. Gas from the inner vortex transfers energy to the gas in the outer vortex, so the outer layer is hotter at the far end than it was initially. The gas in the central vortex is likewise cooler upon its return to the starting-point, where it is released from the tube.

== Method of operation ==
To explain the temperature separation in a vortex tube, there are two main approaches:

=== Fundamental approach: the physics ===
This approach is based on first-principles physics alone and is not limited to vortex tubes only, but applies to moving gas in general. It shows that temperature separation in a moving gas is due only to enthalpy conservation in a moving frame of reference.

The thermal process in the vortex tube can be estimated in the following way:

The main physical phenomenon of the vortex tube is the temperature separation between the cold vortex core and the warm vortex periphery. The "vortex tube effect" is fully explained with the work equation of Euler, also known as Euler's turbine equation, which can be written in its most general vectorial form as:

$$T - \frac{ \vec v \cdot \vec \omega \times  \vec r}{c_p}=\mbox{const}$$,

where $T$ is the total, or stagnation temperature of the rotating gas at radial position $\vec r$, the absolute gas velocity as observed from the stationary frame of reference is denoted with $\vec v$; the angular velocity of the system is $\vec \omega$ and $c_p$ is the isobaric heat capacity of the gas. This equation was published in 2012; it explains the fundamental operating principle of vortex tubes. The search for this explanation began in 1933 when the vortex tube was discovered and continued for more than 80 years.

The above equation is valid for an adiabatic turbine passage; it clearly shows that while gas moving towards the center is getting colder, the peripheral gas in the passage is "getting faster". Therefore, vortex cooling is due to angular propulsion. The more the gas cools by reaching the center, the more rotational energy it delivers to the vortex and thus the vortex rotates even faster. This explanation stems directly from the law of energy conservation. Compressed gas at room temperature is expanded in order to gain speed through a nozzle; it then climbs the centrifugal barrier of rotation during which energy is also lost. The lost energy is delivered to the vortex, which speeds its rotation. In a vortex tube, the cylindrical surrounding wall confines the flow at periphery and thus forces conversion of kinetic into internal energy, which produces hot air at the hot exit.

Therefore, the vortex tube is a rotorless turboexpander. It consists of a rotorless radial inflow turbine (cold end, center) and a rotorless centrifugal compressor (hot end, periphery). The work output of the turbine is converted into heat by the compressor at the hot end.

=== Phenomenological approach ===
This approach relies on observation and experimental data. It is specifically tailored to the geometrical shape of the vortex tube and the details of its flow and is designed to match the particular observables of the complex vortex tube flow, namely turbulence, acoustic phenomena, pressure fields, air velocities and many others. The earlier published models of the vortex tube are phenomenological. They are:

1. Radial pressure difference: centrifugal compression and air expansion
2. Radial transfer of angular momentum
3. Radial acoustic streaming of energy
4. Radial heat pumping

More on these models can be found in recent review articles on vortex tubes.

The phenomenological models were developed at an earlier time when the turbine equation of Euler was not thoroughly analyzed; in the engineering literature, this equation is studied mostly to show the work output of a turbine; while temperature analysis is not performed since turbine cooling has more limited application unlike power generation, which is the main application of turbines. Phenomenological studies of the vortex tube in the past have been useful in presenting empirical data. However, due to the complexity of the vortex flow this empirical approach was able to show only aspects of the effect but was unable to explain its operating principle. Dedicated to empirical details, for a long time the empirical studies made the vortex tube effect appear enigmatic and its explanation – a matter of debate.

== History ==
The vortex tube was invented in 1931 by French physicist Georges J. Ranque. He applied for patent in 1932 and obtained the same in 1934. It was rediscovered by Paul Dirac in 1934 while he was searching for a device to perform isotope separation, leading to development of the Helikon vortex separation process. German physicist Rudolf Hilsch improved the design and published a widely read paper in 1947 on the device, which he called a Wirbelrohr (literally, whirl pipe). In 1954, Westley published a comprehensive survey entitled "A bibliography and survey of the vortex tube", which included over 100 references. From to 1979, Curley and McGree, Kalvinskas, Dobratz, Nash, and Hellyar all made important contribution to the RHVT literature by their extensive reviews on the vortex tube and its applications. From 1952 to 1963, C. Darby Fulton, Jr. obtained four U.S. patents relating to the development of the vortex tube. In 1961, Fulton began manufacturing the vortex tube under the company name Fulton Cryogenics. Fulton sold the company to Vortec, Inc. The vortex tube was used to separate gas mixtures, oxygen and nitrogen, carbon dioxide and helium, carbon dioxide and air in 1967 by Linderstrom-Lang. Vortex tubes also seem to work with liquids to some extent, as demonstrated by Hsueh and Swenson in a laboratory experiment where free body rotation occurs from the core and a thick boundary layer at the wall. Air is separated causing a cooler air stream coming out the exhaust hoping to chill as a refrigerator. In 1988 R. T. Balmer applied liquid water as the working medium. It was found that when the inlet pressure is high, for instance 20-50 bar, the heat energy separation process exists in incompressible (liquids) vortex flow as well. Note that this separation is only due to heating; there is no longer cooling observed since cooling requires compressibility of the working fluid.

== Efficiency ==
Vortex tubes have lower efficiency than traditional air conditioning equipment. They are commonly used for inexpensive spot cooling, when compressed air is available.

== Applications ==
=== Current applications ===
Commercial vortex tubes are designed for industrial applications to produce a temperature drop of up to 71°C (128°F). With no moving parts, no electricity, and no refrigerant, a vortex tube can produce refrigeration up to 1,800 W (6,000 BTU/h) using 100 standard cubic feet per minute (2.832 m^{3}/min) of filtered compressed air at 100 psi (6.9 bar). They are the main technology used in cold air guns, enclosure coolers, and cooling vests. A control valve in the hot air exhaust adjusts temperatures, flows and refrigeration over a wide range.

Vortex tubes are used for cooling of cutting tools (lathes and mills, both manually-operated and CNC machines) during machining. The vortex tube is well-matched to this application: machine shops generally already use compressed air, and a fast jet of cold air provides both cooling and removal of the chips produced by the tool. This eliminates or drastically reduces the need for liquid coolant, which is messy, expensive, and environmentally hazardous.

== See also ==
- Heat pump
- Maxwell's demon
- Windhexe
