= Włodzimierz Klonowski =

Polish physicist (1945–2020)

- Born: 1945; Moscow, Soviet Union
- Died: April 4, 2020 (aged 74–75)

Włodzimierz Klonowski (1945 – April 4, 2020) was a Polish biomedical physicist who worked in the field of biological engineering.

== Life and career ==
Klonowski was born in Moscow, where his parents briefly lived at the end of World War II, on their way back from a Bashkir village in the Ural Mountains, where they had been displaced after the Soviet invasion of Poland in September 1939. He was born on the Stary (Old) Arbat Street, where the name stone in his honour has been put close to the fountain (the former Grauerman maternity hospital has now official address 7 New Arbat). His father, Stefan Klonowski, was a specialist in Polish studies. His mother, Gabriela Pauszer-Klonowska, was a novelist.

Klonowski lived in Warsaw from 1946 until martial law was introduced in Poland in 1981. He obtained his M.Sc. in Physics from the University of Warsaw in 1968 with specializations in Biophysics. Then he worked for several years at the Institute of Basic Technological Research Polish Academy of Sciences on theory of networks and of sol-gel transitions in macromolecular systems. He obtained his Ph.D. in Physics from the Institute of Physics Polish Academy of Sciences in 1973. Then he worked on theory of intracranial pressure at the Department of Neurosurgery, Medical Research Center Polish Academy of Sciences. From there he left with his family to become professor in physics and biophysics at the University of Kinshasa, Kongo (then Zaïre, French-speaking), where he was caught by the martial law in Poland. He was a fellow at the Max Planck Institute of Biophysical Chemistry in Goettingen, Germany (1982–1984) and then with German Fremdenpass, because Polish People Republic refused to give him a valid passport, he moved as a visiting professor to Brandeis University, Waltham, MA, USA (1984–1986).

In 1986 Klonowski decided to emigrate officially to Canada where he has worked at McMaster University, Hamilton, Ontario, and then moved to Halifax, NS, where he established a small computer consulting and tutoring firm. While working in Göttingen Klonowski wrote his habilitation thesis on the theory formation of supramolecular structures in (bio)polymer systems and submitted it to Humboldt University, Berlin (then DDR), since it was recognized in the West as being German and in the East as being socialistic. Only in 1990 after obtaining his Canadian citizenship could he go to Berlin for the colloquium. After reunification of Germany, his Dr.sc.nat. degree in Theoretical Biophysics was officially declared by a special lustrating commission of the new Scientific Council to be equivalent to German habilitation, and then it was recognized in Poland in 1994. Klonowski returned to Poland at the end of 1994 and in 1995 he joined the Institute of Biocybernetics and Biomedical Engineering Polish Academy of Sciences where he served as the Head of the Laboratory of Biosignal Analysis Fundamentals.

His scientific work had an interdisciplinary character. He published a monograph "Probabilistic Theory of Crosslinked Macromolecular Systems with Applications in Chemical Physics and Biophysics" in 1984. A molecular informational structure was named after him - Klonowski-Klonowska conformon. His scientific interests extend from systems biology (The Metaphor of 'Chaos', in: Systems Biology: Principles, Methods, and Concepts, A. K. Konopka, Ed., CRC Press, Boca Raton, 2006), through neuropsychology to philosophy of complexity and consciousness. He served as the editor of series Frontiers of Nonlinear Dynamics (Pabst Science Publisher, Lengerich, Berlin: Attractors, Signals, and Synergetics (2002); From Quanta to Societies (2003), Simplicity behind Complexity (2004)). He has also been actively involved in popularization of science – the edition of 19,500 copies of his book Tajemnice Biofizyki (Mysteries of Biophysics), Warsaw, 1981, sold out in a few months.

Klonowski wrote features for newspapers, in Poland and in Canada, and he was also a candidate to the House of Commons of Canada for the Green Party of Canada, in 1993.^{[a]} He was also an expert of the Polish Chamber of Ecology. For cooperation with Medical Doctors he obtained in 2000 Honorary 50. Anniversary Medal conferred by the Rector of the Medical University of Warsaw and in 2004 he was awarded Golden Cross of Merit conferred by the President of the Republic of Poland.

Klonowski was actively involved in international scientific cooperation. He was the founder and the coordinator of the European Interdisciplinary Schools on Nonlinear Dynamics for System and Signal Analysis EUROATTRACTOR (Framework Programme 5. of the European Community, 2000–2002). In FP 6. he sat on physics panels as an individual expert for Marie Curie and NEST Actions of the European Community and served as the leader of the Group of Biosignal Analysis Fundamentals (GBAF, Medical Research Center Polish Academy of Sciences) in IST Integrated Project SENSATION (2004–2007). He also represented Poland on the Management Committees of three COST Actions – ENOC (where he also served as the chair of the Theoretical Working Group), NEUROMATH, and BM0605.

He was active in scientific societies. In 1969 he founded the Biophysical Section of the Polish Physical Society, Warsaw Division, and then he was a co-founder and the President (1973–1979) of the Warsaw Division of the Polish Biophysical Society. He was a member of the New York Academy of Sciences, SIGMA XI - The Scientific Research Society, Smithsonian Associates, European Physical Society, American Physical Society, American Biophysical Society, American Association for the Advancement of Science, Society for Mathematical Biology, European Society for Engineering and Medicine, International Society of Bioelectromagnetism, American Association of University Professors.

In 1991–2000 he served as an associate editor of IPCT – Interpersonal Computing and Technology, Electronic Journal for the 21st Century, one of the first if not the very first internet journal. In 2007 he founded (Founding Editor), a new open access journal Nonlinear Biomedical Physics (BioMed Central, London) and served as an editor-in-chief of this journal.

In 2016, Klonowski initiated and co-signed an unprecedented letter addressed to one of departments of the Military University of Technology in Warsaw, in which he asked to take away the Ph.D. degree awarded by the department to Maciej Lasek, a former chief of the State Commission on Aircraft Accidents Investigation.

His biograms may be found in several ‘Who’s Who’s, like Kto jest kim w Polsce (‘Who’s Who in Poland’, Ed. IV, PAI, Warsaw, 2001).

He died on April 4, 2020 after long illness. He was buried at the Powązki Military Cemetery.

== Notes ==
a.Listed as Klonowski, W. Vladimir.
