= Absorption heat transformer =

Device which transfers heat from an intermediate temperature to a high temperature

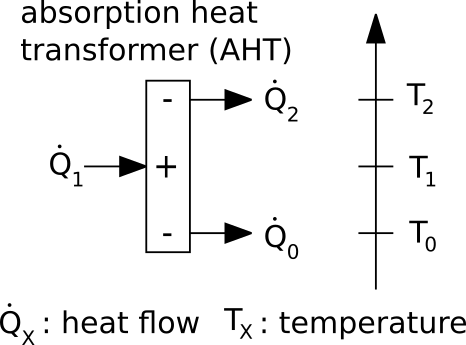
the driving heat flow $\dot Q_1$ at intermediate temperature level $T_1$ will be split in the revalued heat flow $\dot Q_2$ at high temperature level $T_2$ and in rejected heat flow $\dot Q_0$ at low temperature level $T_0$

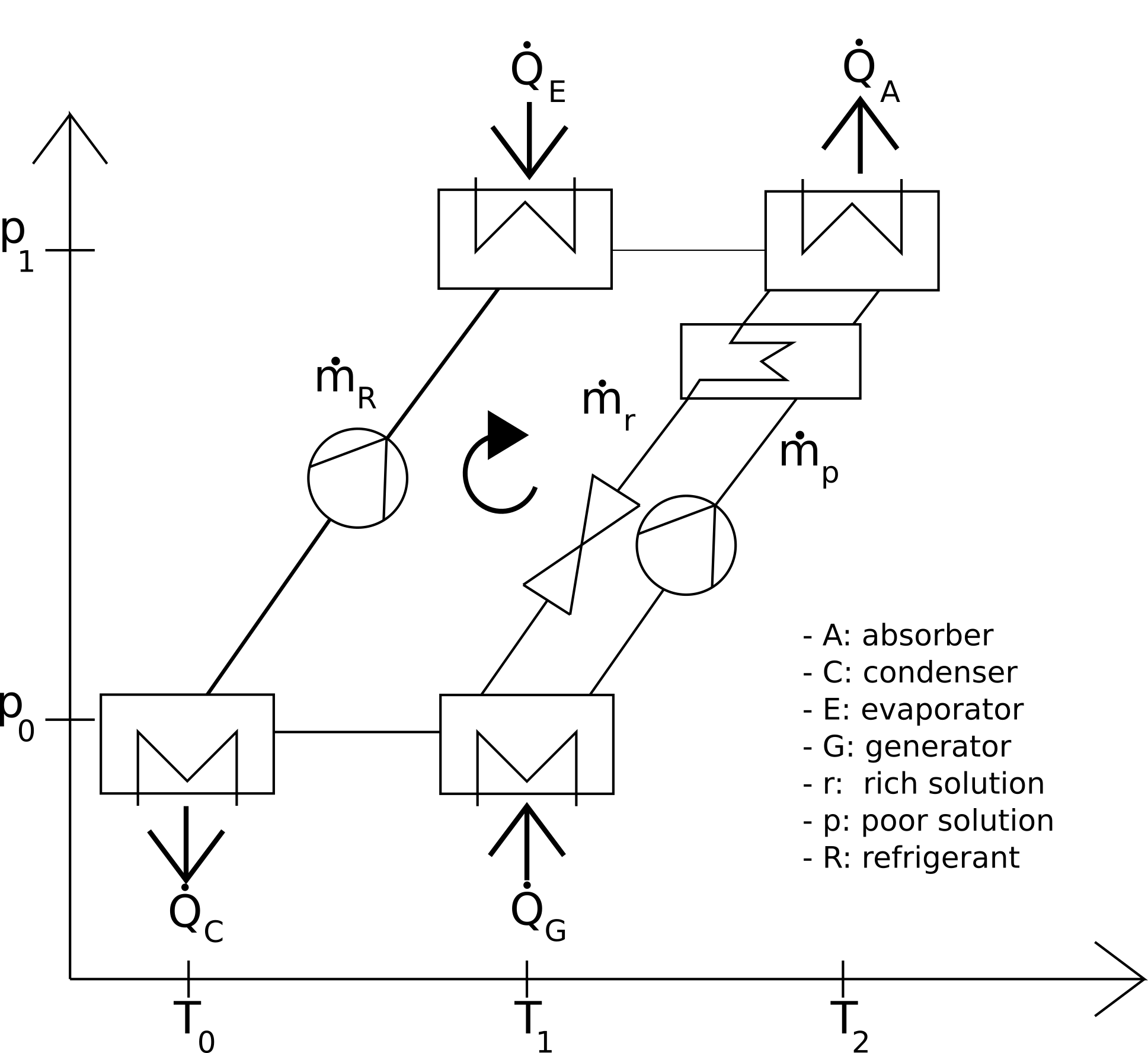
scheme of the absorption heat transformer process

An absorption heat transformer (AHT) is a device which transfers heat from an intermediate temperature level to a high temperature level by means of an absorption process. It is driven by the temperature difference between the intermediate temperature and a low temperature level. The absorption heat transformer splits a heat flow $\dot Q_1$ at an intermediate temperature level $T_1$ in two heat flows, $\dot Q_2$ at a higher (revaluated) temperature level $T_2$ and $\dot Q_0$ at a lower temperature level $T_0$ (rejection heat). Such a device is also denominated type II absorption heat pump or booster heat pump. Absorption heat transformers are especially suitable for heat recovery from industrial processes, its main advantage being the capacity to upgrade to a usable level the temperature of waste heat streams using only negligible quantities of electrical energy and no additional primary energy.

== Definition of the thermal coefficient of performance ==
$$COP_{th} = \frac{\dot Q_2}{\dot Q_1} = \frac{revalued \ heat}{total \ driving \ heat}$$

It revaluates approximately 50% of the driving heat flow. The temperature lift from the intermediate to the high temperature level is up to 50K. The simplest construction, a single effect absorption heat transformer, consists of one condenser, one evaporator, one absorber and one generator. In contrast to a type I absorption heat pump an absorption heat transformer operates in reverse. The difference with absorption heat pump is that the absorber and evaporator now operate at high pressure and the condenser and generator at low pressure. The most common working pairs are water/lithium bromide (refrigerant = water, absorbent = LiBr) and ammonia/water (refrigerant = ammonia, absorbent = water).

== Process ==
A single absorption heat transformer consists of an absorber, generator, evaporator and condenser. In addition, there are a refrigerant pump, solution pump, solution throttle and solution heat exchanger for internal heat recovery. At the evaporator the refrigerant evaporates by the heat input at intermediate temperature level. The refrigerant vapour is absorbed in the absorber. Due to the released heat of absorption the process delivers heat at the high temperature level. This heat is the revalued heat. Consequently, the absorbent is diluted while absorbing the refrigerant vapour. That diluted absorbent streams through the throttle to the generator. In the generator the refrigerant desorbs from the diluted solution. This process is driven by the heat input at the intermediate temperature level. The refrigerant vapour is condensed in the condenser and it is pumped by the refrigerant pump into the evaporator. The heat at the condenser occurs at low temperature level. The concentrated absorbent is pumped into the absorber by the solution pump.
