= David Evans (mathematician) =

British mathematician (1940–2026)

- Born: David V. Evans; 27 October 1940
- Died: 13 March 2026 (aged 85)
- Education: University of Manchester
- Known for: Bristol cylinder (wave energy converter)
- Children: 3; including Alice
- Scientific career
- Fields: Applied mathematics
- Workplaces: University of Bristol
- Doctoral advisor: Fritz Ursell

David V. Evans (27 October 1940 – 13 March 2026) was a British applied mathematician noted for his contributions to water waves and acoustics.

Together with John Nicholas Newman, he initiated the International Workshop on Water Waves and Floating Bodies. He was also known for the Bristol cylinder, a wave energy converter. He was an emeritus professor of Applied Mathematics at the University of Bristol.

== Life and career ==
Evans obtained his BSc in mathematics from the University of Manchester in 1962 and his PhD in 1966 under the supervision of Fritz Ursell. After completing his PhD at the University of Manchester, Evans worked as a post-doc at the Stevens Institute of Technology and MIT before going back to Bristol.

The 21st International Workshop on Water Waves and Floating Bodies is dedicated to Evans on the occasion of his retirement.

Evans died on 13 March 2026, at the age of 85.

== Selected publications ==
- Evans, D. V. (1976), "A theory for wave-power absorption by oscillating bodies", Journal of Fluid Mechanics, 77 (1): 1–25, Bibcode:1976JFM....77....1E, doi:10.1017/S0022112076001109, S2CID 119547146
- Evans, D. V. (1981), "Power From Water Waves", Annual Review of Fluid Mechanics, 13: 157–187, Bibcode:1981AnRFM..13..157E, doi:10.1146/annurev.fl.13.010181.001105
