= Beale number =

In mechanical engineering, the Beale number is a parameter that characterizes the performance of Stirling engines. It is often used to estimate the power output of a Stirling engine design. For engines operating with a high temperature differential, typical values for the Beale number are in the range 0.11−0.15; where a larger number indicates higher performance.

== Definition ==
The Beale number can be defined in terms of a Stirling engine's operating parameters:

$$B_n = \frac{Wo}{PVF}$$

where:

- B_{n} is the Beale number
- Wo is the power output of the engine (watts)
- P is the mean average gas pressure (Pa) or (MPa, if volume is in cm^{3})
- V is swept volume of the power piston (m^{3}, or cm^{3}, if pressure is in MPa)
- F is the engine cycle frequency (Hz)

== Estimating Stirling power ==
To estimate the power output of an engine, nominal values are assumed for the Beale number, pressure, swept volume and frequency, then the power is calculated as the product of these parameters, as follows:

$$Wo = B_n PVF$$

== See also ==
- West number
