= Method of Chester–Friedman–Ursell =

Technique to find asymptotic expansions

In asymptotic analysis, the method of Chester–Friedman–Ursell is a technique to find asymptotic expansions for contour integrals. It was developed as an extension of the steepest descent method for getting uniform asymptotic expansions in the case of coalescing saddle points. The method was published in 1957 by Clive R. Chester, Bernard Friedman and Fritz Ursell.

== Method ==
=== Setting ===
We study integrals of the form

$$I(\alpha,N):=\int_{C}e^{-Nf(\alpha,t)}g(\alpha,t)dt,$$

where $C$ is a contour and

- $f,g$ are two analytic functions in the complex variable $t$ and continuous in $\alpha$.
- $N$ is a large number.

Suppose we have two saddle points $t_+,t_-$ of $f(\alpha,t)$ with multiplicity $1$ that depend on a parameter $\alpha$. If now an $\alpha_0$ exists, such that both saddle points coalescent to a new saddle point $t_0$ with multiplicity $2$, then the steepest descent method no longer gives uniform asymptotic expansions.

=== Procedure ===
Suppose there are two simple saddle points $t_{-}:=t_{-}(\alpha)$ and $t_{+}:=t_{+}(\alpha)$ of $f$ and suppose that they coalescent in the point $t_0:=t_0(\alpha_0)$.

We start with the cubic transformation $t\mapsto w$ of $f(\alpha,t)$, this means we introduce a new complex variable $w$ and write

$$f(\alpha,t)=\tfrac{1}{3}w^3-\eta(\alpha) w+A(\alpha),$$

where the coefficients $\eta:=\eta(\alpha)$ and $A:=A(\alpha)$ will be determined later.

We have

$$\frac{dt}{dw}=\frac{w^2-\eta}{f_t(\alpha,t)},$$

so the cubic transformation will be analytic and injective only if $dt/dw$ and $dw/dt$ are neither $0$ nor $\infty$. Therefore $t=t_{-}$ and $t=t_{+}$ must correspond to the zeros of $w^2-\eta$, i.e. with $w_{+}:=\eta^{1/2}$ and $w_{-}:=-\eta^{1/2}$. This gives the following system of equations

$$\begin{cases}
f(\alpha,t_{-})=-\frac{2}{3}\eta^{3/2}+A,\\
f(\alpha,t_{+})=\frac{2}{3}\eta^{3/2}+A,
\end{cases}$$

we have to solve to determine $\eta$ and $A$. A theorem by Chester–Friedman–Ursell (see below) says now, that the cubic transform is analytic and injective in a local neighbourhood around the critical point $(\alpha_0,t_0)$.

After the transformation the integral becomes

$$I(\alpha,N)=e^{-NA}\int_L \exp\left(-N\left(\tfrac{1}{3}w^3-\eta w\right)\right)h(\alpha,w)dw,$$

where $L$ is the new contour for $w$ and

$$h(\alpha,w):=g(\alpha,t)\frac{dt}{dw}=g(\alpha,t)\frac{w^2-\eta}{f_t(\alpha,t)}.$$

The function $h(\alpha,w)$ is analytic at $w_{+}(\alpha),w_{-}(\alpha)$ for $\alpha\neq \alpha_0$ and also at the coalescing point $w_0$ for $\alpha_0$. Here ends the method and one can see the integral representation of the complex Airy function.

Chester–Friedman–Ursell note to write $h(\alpha,w)$ not as a single power series but instead as

$$h(\alpha,w)=\sum\limits_{m} q_m(\alpha)(w^2-\eta)^m+ \sum\limits_{m} p_m(\alpha) w(w^2-\eta)^m$$

to really get asymptotic expansions.

=== Theorem by Chester–Friedman–Ursell ===
Let $t_{+}:=t_{+}(\alpha),t_{-}:=t_{-}(\alpha)$ and $t_{0}:=t_{0}(\alpha_0)$ be as above. The cubic transformation

$$f(t,\alpha)=\tfrac{1}{3}w^3-\eta(\alpha) w+A(\alpha)$$

with the above derived values for $\eta(\alpha)$ and $A(\alpha)$, such that $t=t_{\pm}$ corresponds to $u=\pm\eta^{1/2}$, has only one branch point $w=w(\alpha,t)$, so that for all $\alpha$ in a local neighborhood of $\alpha_0$ the transformation is analytic and injective.

== Literature ==
- Chester, Clive R.; Friedman, Bernard; Ursell, Fritz (1957). "An extension of the method of steepest descents". Mathematical Proceedings of the Cambridge Philosophical Society. 53 (3). Cambridge University Press. page 604. doi:10.1017/S0305004100032655.
- Olver, Frank W. J. (1997). Asymptotics and Special Functions. A K Peters/CRC Press. p. 351. doi:10.1201/9781439864548. ISBN 978-0-429-06461-6.
- Wong, Roderick (2001). Asymptotic Approximations of Integrals. Society for Industrial and Applied Mathematics. doi:10.1137/1.9780898719260. ISBN 978-0-89871-497-5.
- Temme, Nico M. (2014). Asymptotic Methods For Integrals. Series in Analysis. Vol. 6. World Scientific. doi:10.1142/9195. ISBN 978-981-4612-15-9.
