= Robert F. Beck =

American marine engineering professor

- Born: 1943 (age 82–83)
- Education: Massachusetts Institute of Technology; University of Michigan
- Awards: Society of Naval Architects and Marine Engineers, Davidson Medal (2000); Georg Weinblum Memorial Lectureship (2008-2009)
- Scientific career
- Fields: Marine hydrodynamics
- Workplaces: University of Michigan
- Doctoral advisor: John Nicholas Newman

Robert F. Beck (born 1943) is the Richard B. Couch Professor of Naval Architecture and Marine Engineering at the University of Michigan. He is the editor of the Journal of Ship Research.

== Education and career ==
B.S.E. University of Michigan, 1965; Naval Architecture & Marine Engineering

B.S.E. University of Michigan, 1965; Aeronautical & Astronautical Engineering

S.M. M.I.T., 1967; Naval Architecture & Marine Engineering

N.A. M.I.T., 1968; Naval Architecture & Marine Engineering

Ph.D. M.I.T., 1970; Naval Architecture & Marine Engineering

== Selected publications ==
- Beck, R. F. (1994), "Time-domain computations for floating bodies", Applied Ocean Research, 16 (5): 267–282, Bibcode:1994AppOR..16..267B, doi:10.1016/0141-1187(94)90016-7, hdl:2027.42/31913
