= Fritz Ursell =

British mathematician (1923–2012)

Fritz J. Ursell
- Born: 28 April 1923; Düsseldorf, Germany
- Died: 11 May 2012 (aged 89); Manchester, UK
- Education: Trinity College, Cambridge
- Known for: Ursell number Method of Chester–Friedman–Ursell
- Awards: Fellow of the Royal Society (1972); Georg Weinblum Lectureship (1985–1986); IMA Gold Medal (1994)
- Scientific career
- Fields: Applied mathematics
- Workplaces: University of Manchester; University of Cambridge
- Doctoral students: J. N. Newman; E. O. Tuck; David Evans

Fritz Joseph Ursell FRS (28 April 1923 – 11 May 2012) was a British mathematician noted for his contributions to fluid mechanics, especially in the area of wave-structure interactions. He held the Beyer Chair of Applied Mathematics at the University of Manchester from 1961 to 1990, was elected Fellow of the Royal Society in 1972 and retired in 1990.

== Education ==
Ursell came to England as a Jewish refugee in 1937 from Germany, and was educated at Marlborough College. From 1941 to 1943 he studied at Trinity College, Cambridge, graduating with a bachelor degree in mathematics.

== Career ==
At the end of 1943 Ursell joined the Admiralty as a part of a team—headed by George Deacon —whose task was to formulate rules for forecasting waves for the allied landings in Japan. Their findings have become the basis of modern wave-forecasting. Ursell stayed in the Admiralty until 1947. In 1947 he was appointed to a post-doctoral fellowship in applied mathematics at Manchester University without a doctorate. In 1950 he returned to Cambridge as lecturer. There he met G. I. Taylor. In 1957 he spent a year at Massachusetts Institute of Technology, having been invited by Arthur Ippen. In 1961 Ursell moved back to Manchester.

In 1994 Ursell was awarded the Gold Medal of the Institute of Mathematics and its Applications in recognition of his "outstanding contributions to mathematics and its applications over a period of years".

== Scientific work ==
In 1957 he published together with Clive R. Chester and Bernard Friedman a classic paper that introduced a method to find asymptotic expansions for contour integrals with coalescing saddle points. The method is now called method of Chester–Friedman–Ursell.

== Personal life ==
Fritz Ursell was married to Katharina Renate Zander in 1959. They had two daughters. Susie and Ruth, Susie is married and has two children. Following his death on 11 May, in hospital, Ursell's funeral took place on 15 May 2012 at Manchester Crematorium.

Preceded by James Lighthill	Beyer Chair of Applied Mathematics at University of Manchester; 1961 – 1990	Succeeded by Philip Hall
