= West number =

The West number is an empirical parameter used to characterize the performance of Stirling engines and other Stirling systems. It is very similar to the Beale number where a larger number indicates higher performance; however, the West number includes temperature compensation. The West number is often used to approximate of the power output of a Stirling engine. The average value is (0.25) for a wide variety of engines, although it may range up to (0.35), particularly for engines operating with a high temperature differential.

The West number may be defined as:

$$W_n = \frac{Wo}{PVf} \frac{T_\text{H} + T_\text{K}}{T_\text{H} - T_\text{K}} = B_n \frac{T_\text{H} + T_\text{K}}{T_\text{H} - T_\text{K}}$$

where:

- W_{n} is the West number
- W_{o} is the power output of the engine (watts)
- P is the mean average gas pressure (Pa) or (MPa, if volume is in cm^{3})
- V is swept volume of the expansion space (m^{3}, or cm^{3}, if pressure is in MPa)
- f is the engine cycle frequency (Hz)
- T_{H} is the absolute temperature of the expansion space or heater (kelvins)
- T_{K} is the absolute temperature of the compression space or cooler (kelvins)
- B_{n} is the Beale number for an engine operating between temperatures T_{H} and T_{K}

When the Beale number is known, but the West number is not known, it is possible to calculate it. First calculate the West number at the temperatures T_{H} and T_{K} for which the Beale number is known, and then use the resulting West number to calculate output power for other temperatures.

To estimate the power output of a new engine design, nominal values are assumed for the West number, pressure, swept volume and frequency, and the power is calculated as follows:

$$W_o = W_n PVf \frac{T_\text{H} - T_\text{K}}{T_\text{H} + T_\text{K}}$$

For example, with an absolute temperature ratio of 2, the portion of the equation representing temperature correction equals 1/3. With a temperature ratio of 3, the temperature term is 1/2. This factor accounts for the difference between the West equation, and the Beale equation in which this temperature term is taken as a constant. Thus, the Beale number is typically in the range of 0.10 to 0.15, which is about 1/3 to 1/2 the value of the West number.
