= Wolf summation =

The Wolf summation is a method for computing the electrostatic interactions of systems (e.g. crystals). This method is generally more computationally efficient than the Ewald summation. It was proposed by Dieter Wolf.

== See also ==
- Wolf method on SklogWiki
