= Nick Newman (naval architect) =

American naval architect (born 1935)

- Born: 10 March 1935 (age 91); New Haven, Connecticut, U.S.
- Education: Massachusetts Institute of Technology
- Known for: Newman's approximation, WAMIT
- Awards: Royal Institution of Naval Architects, Bronze Medal (1976); Society of Naval Architects and Marine Engineers, Davidson Medal (1988); Georg Weinblum Memorial Lectureship (1988-1989)
- Scientific career
- Fields: Marine hydrodynamics
- Workplaces: Massachusetts Institute of Technology
- Doctoral advisor: Fritz Ursell
- Doctoral students: Robert F. Beck

John Nicholas "Nick" Newman (born 10 March 1935) is an American naval architect noted for his contributions to marine hydrodynamics. Together with David Evans, he initiated the International Workshop on Water Waves and Floating Bodies. He is also known for his contribution in the development of the wave–structure interaction code WAMIT. He is currently emeritus professor of Naval Architecture at Massachusetts Institute of Technology.

== Education and career ==
Newman's degrees (S.B. 1956, S.M. 1957, and Sc.D. 1960) are all from MIT, and were all taken in the field of Naval Architecture and Marine Engineering. From 1959 to 1967 he worked as a research naval architect at David Taylor Model Basin. In 1967 he moved back to MIT and held a long academic career there.

He is a member of the National Academy of Engineering, and of the Norwegian Academy of Science and Letters. In 1992, the Norwegian University of Science and Technology in Trondheim awarded him an honorary doctorate.

In 2008, a symposium was organized in his honor at the 27th International Conference on Offshore Mechanics and Arctic Engineering.

== Personal ==
Newman is married to Kathleen Smedley Kirk. They have three children.

== Books ==
- John Nicholas Newman (1977). Marine hydrodynamics. Cambridge, Massachusetts: MIT Press. ISBN 0-262-14026-8.

== Selected publications ==
- Newman, J. N. (1962). "The exciting forces on fixed bodies in waves". Journal of Ship Research. 6 (4): 10–17. doi:10.5957/jsr.1962.6.4.10.
- Newman, J. N. (1965). "The exciting forces on moving bodies in waves". Journal of Ship Research. 9 (3): 190–199. doi:10.5957/jsr.1965.9.4.190.
- Newman, J. N. (1974). "Second order, slowly varying forces on vessels in irregular waves". Proc. Intl. Symp. On Dynamics of Marine Vehicles and Offshore Structures in Waves.
- Newman, J. N. (1985). "Algorithms for the free-surface Green function". Journal of Engineering Mathematics. 19 (1): 56–67. Bibcode:1985JEnMa..19...57N. doi:10.1007/BF00055041. S2CID 121920975.
- Newman, J. N. (1986). "Distributions of sources and normal dipoles over a quadrilateral panel". Journal of Engineering Mathematics. 20 (2): 113–126. Bibcode:1986JEnMa..20..113N. doi:10.1007/BF00042771. S2CID 122267445.
