= Trzebiatowski Institute of Low Temperature and Structure Research of the Polish Academy of Sciences =

Scientific institute in Wrocław, Poland

Coordinates: 51°06′04″N 17°04′04″E

The Włodzimierz Trzebiatowski Institute of Low Temperature and Structure Research is a scientific institute in Wrocław, Poland. It is named after Włodzimierz Trzebiatowski, the Polish chemist, physicist and mathematician.

== Localization ==
Until 1993 the Institute was placed at Gajowicka street and the Bishop Palace, that after the II World War was requisitioned by the Polish People's Republic government. Currently the Institute is placed at Okólna street in Wrocław.
