= Witold Milewski =

Polish mathematician and physicist

Witold Milewski (1817–1889) was a Polish mathematician, physicist, and pedagogue.

In 1853 he became director of the Gymnasium in Trzemeszno.
