= William Bassichis =

American physicist

William H. Bassichis is an American physicist. He has been a physics professor at Texas A&M University since 1970. He is the author of a series of undergraduate physics textbooks titled Don't Panic, which is used by some universities across North America. Before teaching at Texas A&M, Bassichis has done research at the Weizmann Institute of Science, the Centre d'études Nucléaires de Saclay, and the Lawrence Livermore Laboratory. He has also taught at MIT.

== Education ==
Bassichis graduated from the Massachusetts Institute of Technology in 1959. He received his master's and his Ph.D. from Case Institute of Technology, in 1961 and 1963, respectively.

== Awards ==
Bassichis has been awarded the university-wide Faculty Distinguished Achievement Award for Teaching and two College of Science Faculty Distinguished Achievement Awards for Teaching, both awarded by The Association of Former Students. On April 25, 2003, he named Presidential Professor for Teaching Excellence, a rank which was created by former university president Robert Gates.

== Research ==
Dr. Bassichis's research interests include nuclear theory with emphasis on many-body theory and the prediction of the properties of nuclei in terms of constituent interactions, nucleus-nucleus scattering theory, solar energy studies using flat plate collectors and the advantages of a vacuum environment.

Professor Bassichis has published 51 peer-reviewed articles in the field of theoretical atomic physics. The five most cited ones are:

- Bassichis, W. H.; Kerman, A. K.; Svenne, J. P. (1967-08-20). "Unrestricted Hartree-Fock Treatment of Finite Nuclei". Physical Review. 160 (4). American Physical Society (APS): 746–752. doi:10.1103/physrev.160.746. ISSN 0031-899X. (Times Cited: 124)
- Bassichis, W.H.; Ripka, G. (1965). "A Hartree-Fock calculation of excited states of O^{16}". Physics Letters. 15 (4). Elsevier BV: 320–322. doi:10.1016/0031-9163(65)91272-2. ISSN 0031-9163. (Times Cited: 109)
- Bassichis, W. H.; Giraud, B.; Ripka, G. (1965-12-20). "Projected Hartree-Fock Spectra in Light Nuclei". Physical Review Letters. 15 (25). American Physical Society (APS): 980–982. doi:10.1103/physrevlett.15.980. ISSN 0031-9007. (Times Cited: 77)
- Bassichis, W.H.; Pohl, B.A.; Kerman, A.K. (1968). "The effects of truncation in nuclear Hartree-Fock calculations". Nuclear Physics A. 112 (2). Elsevier BV: 360–371. doi:10.1016/0375-9474(68)90207-8. ISSN 0375-9474. (Times Cited: 42)
- Bassichis, W. H.; Scheck, F. (1966-05-20). "Giant Dipole Resonances in the s−d Shell and Their Electromagnetic Properties". Physical Review. 145 (3). American Physical Society (APS): 771–778. doi:10.1103/physrev.145.771. ISSN 0031-899X. (Times Cited: 32)
