= Watson interferometer =

The Watson interferometer is a vintage microscope accessory (for use only in reflected light microscopy) which was manufactured by the Watson Company in Great Britain. It is a variant of Michelson interferometer that can be installed on a conventional microscope. It consists of a beam splitter and varying the distance between the specimen surface and the image of the reference mirror creates interference fringes. For transmitted light investigations in biology, the C. Watson company produced the Smith/Baker system in the 1950s.
