= Darrin M. York =

American computational chemist

- Education: University of North Carolina at Chapel Hill (B.S., Ph.D.)
- Known for: QM/MM methods; Quantum mechanical force fields; Alchemical free energy methods; RNA catalysis; High-throughput molecular simulation
- Awards: New Jersey Professor of the Year (2014); Rutgers Faculty Scholar-Teacher Award (2014); SAS Award for Distinguished Contributions to Undergraduate Education (2013); Grossman Innovation Prize (2020)
- Scientific career
- Fields: Computational chemistry; Theoretical chemistry; Biophysics
- Workplaces: University of Minnesota; Rutgers University
- Doctoral advisor: Lee G. Pedersen
- Other academic advisors: Weitao Yang; Martin Karplus

Darrin M. York is an American computational chemist and biophysicist. He is a Distinguished Professor and Henry Rutgers University Professor in the Department of Chemistry and Chemical Biology at Rutgers University. His research focuses on the development and application of multiscale quantum and classical computational methods for biological systems, including quantum/molecular mechanics (QM/MM) approaches, quantum mechanical force fields, alchemical free energy methods, simulations of RNA catalysis, and high-throughput computational tools for drug discovery.

== Early life and education ==
York received his Bachelor of Science in chemistry with honors from the University of North Carolina at Chapel Hill in 1989, and his Ph.D. in theoretical/physical chemistry from the same institution in 1993, where he studied molecular dynamics simulations of HIV-1 protease under the supervision of Lee G. Pedersen. He held an NSF Postdoctoral Fellowship in Computational Science and Engineering with Weitao Yang at Duke University (1993–1996), an NIH Postdoctoral Fellowship with Martin Karplus at Harvard University (1996–1997), and an EMBO Postdoctoral Fellowship in Karplus’s group at Université Louis Pasteur (1997–1998).

== Academic career ==
York joined the University of Minnesota faculty in 1998 as Assistant professor and later Associate Professor of Chemistry, holding graduate faculty appointments in chemical physics, computational neuroscience, scientific computation and chemical biology. He directed the Graduate Program in Scientific Computation and served as an Associate Fellow of the Supercomputing Institute for Digital Simulation and Advanced Computation.

In 2010 he was appointed Professor in the Department of Chemistry and Chemical Biology at Rutgers University. He has held numerous leadership roles, including Henry Rutgers University Professor (2015), founding Director of the Laboratory for Biomolecular Simulation Research (LBSR), Director of the CyberLearning Innovation & Research Center (CIRC), Director/Coordinator of the General Chemistry program, and Director of the Chemistry Lecture Demonstration Facility.

He has chaired the Biophysical Division of the department and authored initiatives to modernize gateway chemistry instruction. York is a resident member of the Institute for Quantitative Biomedicine and a member of the BioMaPS Institute for Quantitative Biology; since 2019 he has been listed as research faculty in Cancer Pharmacology at the Cancer Institute of New Jersey. He has served as a permanent member of the NIH Macromolecular Structure and Function D study section and reviewed for numerous NIH and NSF panels. York is a long-time contributor to community molecular simulation software, including development work for AMBER and involvement with CHARMM.

== Research ==
York's research program combines method development, algorithm design, software engineering and applications. His group develops multiscale quantum mechanical force fields and QM/MM techniques for condensed-phase biomolecular simulations, including semiempirical and orbital-based quantum force-field approaches, long-range electrostatics treatments, and methods for polarization and many-body interactions.

A second major area is alchemical free energy methods and enhanced-sampling techniques for binding free energies and conformational landscapes. His group has worked to scale free-energy calculations through GPU acceleration, optimized alchemical pathways, enhanced sampling schemes, and machine-learning integration, designing reproducible, high-throughput workflows suitable for drug-discovery lead optimization.

York has applied these methods to computational enzymology and RNA catalysis, using hybrid quantum/classical approaches to characterize catalytic strategies of ribozymes, probe metal-ion roles and solvation in phosphoryl transfer, and relate theoretical predictions to experimental observables such as kinetic isotope effects. His group has published mechanisms of hammerhead, hairpin, HDV, twister and other catalytic RNAs, and has produced benchmarks and databases of quantum calculations for RNA catalysis.

His research portfolio includes major high-performance computing allocations (e.g., XSEDE, Frontera, Summit) and industrial collaborations integrating free-energy methods into drug-discovery software. LBSR has partnered with industry to incorporate GPU-accelerated alchemical free-energy modules into AMBER.

York has authored or coauthored more than 240 scientific publications in journals including The Journal of Chemical Physics, Biochemistry, Proceedings of the National Academy of Sciences, and Journal of Chemical Theory and Computation.

== Honors and awards ==
- Henry Rutgers University Professor
- New Jersey Professor of the Year (2014), Carnegie Foundation / CASE
- Rutgers Faculty Scholar-Teacher Award (2014)
- Award for Distinguished Contributions to Undergraduate Education, Rutgers School of Arts and Sciences (2013)
- EMBO, NSF and NIH postdoctoral fellowships
- Honorary membership, Phi Beta Kappa (Rutgers chapter)
- Grossman Innovation Prize (2020), Rutgers School of Arts and Sciences

== Selected publications ==
- Darden, T.; York, D. M.; Pedersen, L. (1993). "Particle mesh Ewald: An N log(N) method for Ewald sums in large systems". Journal of Chemical Physics. 98: 10089–10092.
- York, D. M.; Wlodawer, A.; Pedersen, L. G.; Darden, T. (1994). "Atomic level accuracy in simulations of protein crystals". Proceedings of the National Academy of Sciences. 91: 8715–8718.
- York, D. M.; Darden, T. A.; Pedersen, L. G.; Andersen, M. W. (1993). "Molecular dynamics simulation of HIV-1 protease in a crystalline environment and in solution". Biochemistry. 32: 1443–1453.
- Brooks, B. R.; Brooks, C. L.; Mackerell, A. D.; Nilsson, L.; Petrella, R. J.; Roux, B.; York, D. M. (2009). "CHARMM: The biomolecular simulation program". Journal of Computational Chemistry. 30: 1545–1614.
- Lee, T.-S.; Silva-Lopez, C.; Giambasu, G. M.; Martick, M.; Scott, W. G.; York, D. M. (2008). "Role of Mg2+ in hammerhead ribozyme catalysis from molecular simulation". Journal of the American Chemical Society. 130: 3053–3064.
- Martick, M.; Lee, T.-S.; York, D. M.; Scott, W. G. (2008). "Solvent structure and hammerhead ribozyme catalysis". Chemistry & Biology. 15: 332–342.
- Lopez, X.; McGrath, M. J.; Range, K.; York, D. M. (2004). "The structure and stability of biological metaphosphate, phosphate, and phosphorane compounds". Journal of the American Chemical Society. 126: 1654–1665.
- Nam, K.; Gao, J.; York, D. M. (2005). "An efficient linear-scaling Ewald method for long-range electrostatic interactions in QM/MM calculations". Journal of Chemical Theory and Computation. 1: 2–13.
