= Włodzimierz Trzebiatowski =

Polish scientist

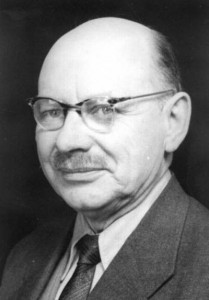
Włodzimierz Trzebiatowski

Włodzimierz Trzebiatowski (February 25, 1906 in Grodzisk Wielkopolski – November 13, 1982) was a Polish chemist, physicist and mathematician. An institute in Wrocław, Poland called the Włodzimierz Trzebiatowski Institute of Low Temperature and Structure Research is named after him.
