= Conformon =

From a biological standpoint, the goal-directed molecular motions inside living cells are carried out by biopolymers acting like molecular machines (e.g. myosin, RNA/DNA polymerase, ion pumps, etc.). These molecular machines are driven by conformons, that is sequence-specific mechanical strains generated by free energy released in chemical reactions or stress induced destabilisations in supercoiled biopolymer chains. Therefore, conformons can be defined as packets of conformational energy generated from substrate binding or chemical reactions and confined within biopolymers.

On the other hand, from a physics standpoint, the conformon is a localization of elastic and electronic energy which may propagate in space with or without dissipation. The mechanism which involves dissipationless propagation is a form of molecular superconductivity. On quantum mechanical level both elastic/vibrational and electronic energy can be quantised, therefore the conformon carries a fixed portion of energy. This has led to the definition of quantum of conformation (shape).
