= William P. Winfree =

American experimental physicist (born 1951)

William Paul Winfree (born 9 March 1951) is an American experimental physicist who is known for his contributions to the field of nondestructive evaluation.

Winfree received his B.A. in 1973 from George Mason University, where he graduated magna cum laude and was awarded the department citation as the outstanding undergraduate in mathematics and physics. He earned his M.S. and Ph.D. in physics from The College of William & Mary in 1975 and 1978, respectively.

Winfree is the Head of the Nondestructive Evaluation Science Branch at NASA Langley Research Center and is also Adjunct Professor of Applied Science at William & Mary.

He is married to Barbara Winfree. The two have three children: Paul Leighton, Adam David Rildagino Lexus Maximus Constantine, and Emily ("Wu") Elizabeth.
