= Georges J. Ranque =

Georges-Joseph Ranque (7 February 1898 – 15 January 1973) was the inventor of the Ranque-Hilsch vortex tube, which generates streams of hot and cold gas from a stream of compressed gas.

Georges-Joseph Ranque was born in Ambérieu-en-Bugey, France in 1898. His father, Léon-Joseph Ranque, worked as an engineer for a railroad; his mother was Joséphine Saint Germain. Georges attended the St. Louis lycée, where he became interested in physics. In 1918, he was admitted to the École Polytechnique in Paris, where he studied physics. Subsequently he did post-graduate work at the Conservatoire des Arts-et-Métiers.

For six years he had been interested in the operation of the Pantone carburetor. This led him, in turn, to the study of vortices. In 1922, he was trying to develop an industrial vacuum pump for vacuuming iron filings. While studying the flow of air through the pump, he inserted a cone at one end of a tube in which air was flowing in the form of a vortex, and he noticed what is now called the Ranque effect; namely, that a stream of air could be split into two streams, one of hot air and the other of cold air. In 1931, he filed for a patent on his vortex tube, and in 1933, he presented a paper on it.

In 1923, Ranque went to work for the Saint-Jacques steelworks in Montluçon, where he improved methods of producing steel. He became head of the metallurgical laboratory at Saint-Jacques, where he helped develop steels that would be used as armor in tanks and in the Maginot Line.

In 1926, he married Eugénie Pierre in La Chapelaude. The couple had six children: Marie-Josèphe, Pierre, Marie-Noëlle, Marie-Thérèse, Monique and Marie-France.

During the Second World War, he developed steels and alloys that would later be used by the aviation industry. After the war, he accepted a position at the Aubert et Duval steelworks in Les Ancizes. There, as director of the metallurgical laboratory, he developed alloys for aviation.

In 1972, he published a book on the search for the philosopher’s stone, La Pierre philosophale.

He died in 1973 in Colombes, a suburb of Paris.
