= Wavenumber–frequency diagram =

Diagrams representing dispersion in atmospheric waves

A wavenumber–frequency diagram is a plot displaying the relationship between the wavenumber (spatial frequency) and the frequency (temporal frequency) of certain phenomena. Usually frequencies are placed on the vertical axis, while wavenumbers are placed on the horizontal axis.

In the atmospheric sciences, these plots are a common way to visualize atmospheric waves.

In the geosciences, especially seismic data analysis, these plots also called f–k plot, in which energy density within a given time interval is contoured on a frequency-versus-wavenumber basis. They are used to examine the direction and apparent velocity of seismic waves and in velocity filter design.

== Origins ==
In general, the relationship between wavelength $\lambda$, frequency $\nu$, and the phase velocity $v_{p}$ of a sinusoidal wave is:

$$v_\text{p} = \lambda \nu$$

Using the wavenumber ($k=2\pi/\lambda$) and angular frequency ($\omega=2\pi\nu$) notation, the previous equation can be rewritten as

$$v_\text{p} = \frac{\omega}{k}$$

On the other hand, the group velocity is equal to the slope of the wavenumber–frequency diagram:

$$v_\text{g} = \frac{\partial\omega}{\partial k}$$

Analyzing such relationships in detail often yields information on the physical properties of the medium, such as density, composition, etc.

== See also ==
- Dispersion relation
