= WAMIT =

WAMIT is a computer program for computing wave loads and motions of offshore structures in waves. It is based on the linear and second-order potential theory. The velocity potential is solved by means of boundary integral equation method, also known as panel method. WAMIT has the capability of representing the geometry of the structure by a higher-order method, whereby the potential is represented by continuous B-splines.

WAMIT was developed by researchers at Massachusetts Institute of Technology, hence the acronym WaveAnalysisMIT. Its first version was launched in 1987. In 1999, WAMIT, Inc. was founded by Chang-Ho Lee and J. Nicholas Newman. Consortiums are held annually to discuss applications and new capabilities of the program.
