= WindShear =

Automotive wind tunnel in North Carolina, USA

Coordinates: 35.40084°N 80.70244°W

The Windshear Full Scale Rolling Road Wind Tunnel is an automotive wind tunnel in Concord, North Carolina.

In January 2008 Wind Shear, a division of US machine tool builder Haas Automation, completed construction on one of the most advanced automotive wind tunnels in the world. The full-scale tunnel is located adjacent to Concord Regional Airport in Concord, North Carolina. The commercial operation was designed for vehicles from race industries: stock car, Formula One, IndyCar, drag racing, as well as production car industries.

Wind Shear's tunnel is a closed air circuit, temperature-controlled system built around a rolling road. The rolling road, akin to a giant treadmill, is 10 ft wide by 29.5 ft long (3 m x 9 m) and accommodates full-size cars. Air and rolling road speeds are coordinated up to 180 mph (80 m/s). Air temperature, critical to repeatable data collection, is maintained at a constant 75 °F (24 °C), plus or minus one degree. Air is moved through the massive 15,000 sq ft (1,400 m^{2}) air circuit at the maximum rate of 47,500 cu ft (1,350 m^{3}) per second by a 5,100 hp (3,800 kW) motor and 29 carbon fiber blades 22 feet (6.7 m) in diameter.

In wind tunnel testing, the size of the test chamber can greatly affect the quality of the test. An example of this, the blockage effect, is the condition where air flow in the wind tunnel is partially blocked by the vehicle. The blockage becomes more critical as the cross section of the test vehicle increases relative to the size of nozzle and airstream. As the vehicle increases in size relative to the nozzle, test data become less reliable as increased blockage effects the quality of the actual windstream. Windshear's solution was to build a sufficiently large air circuit. Nozzle size is a relatively large 180 square feet (16.7 square meters).

== See also ==
- Wind shear

== Bibliography ==
- Gary Graves (January 23, 2008). "Haas CNC ready to share its new wind-tunnel technology". USA Today.
- Joel Walters / SAE International Technical Paper (April 16, 2012). "The Windshear Rolling Road Wind Tunnel". SAE International Journal of Passenger Cars - Mechanical Systems. 5. SAE International: 265–288. doi:10.4271/2012-01-0300.
