= Absorption heat pump =

Heat pump driven by thermal energy

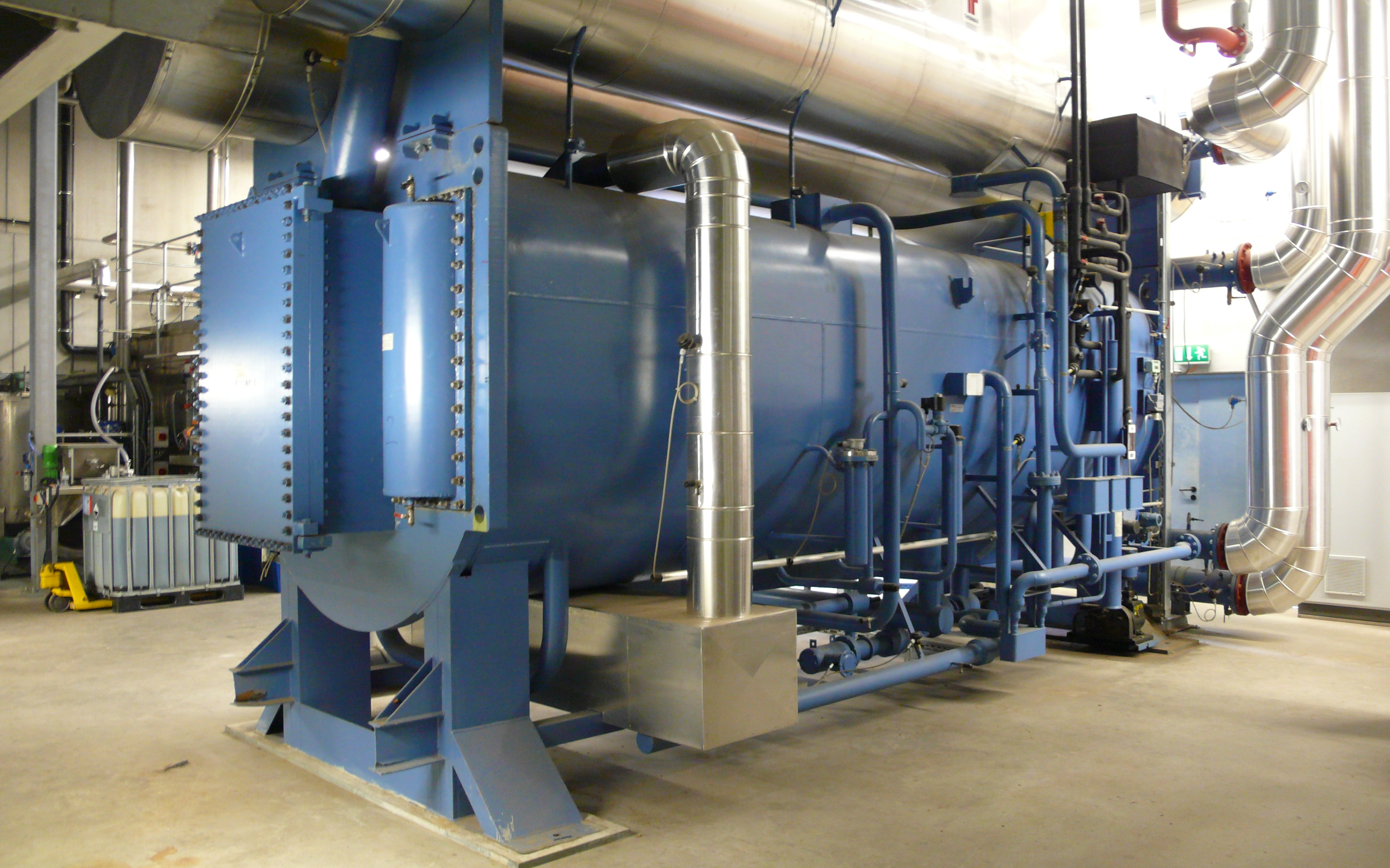
14,000 kW absorption heat pump

An absorption heat pump (AHP) is a heat pump driven by thermal energy such as combustion of natural gas, steam solar-heated water, air, or geothermally heated water, unlike a compression heat pump, which is driven by mechanical energy. AHPs are more complex and require larger units than compression heat pumps. In particular, the electricity demand of such heat pumps is only for pumping liquid and often powering fans, so is much lower than that of compression heat pumps. AHPs' applications are restricted to those cases when electricity is extremely expensive or a large amount of unutilized heat at suitable temperatures is available and when the cooling or heating output has a greater value than heat input consumed. Absorption refrigerators work on the same principle, but are not reversible and cannot serve as a heat source.

== Operating principles ==
The heat pump system is made up of some main units such as the generator, condenser, evaporator, absorber and heat exchanger, as well as the suction device, shielding pump (solution pump and refrigerant pump). In the simplest case, five heat exchangers are also required (at each component and an internal heat exchanger). Other components include solution heat exchangers, valves, as well as the suction device, shielding pump (solution pump and refrigerant pump) and other auxiliary parts.

For the absorption heat pump circulation, the absorber, generator and pump can be regarded as a "thermal compressor". The absorber is equivalent to the inlet side of the compressor, and the generator is equivalent to the outlet side of the compressor. The absorbent can be regarded as a carrier liquid that transports the generated refrigerant gas from the low-pressure side of the cycle to the high-pressure side.

Since the main components of devices that achieve three purposes are the same, there is a heat pump that enables it to realize all working modes: heat pump mode, cooler mode and heat transformer mode. The absorption heat pump can be used as a cooler during summer while, during winter, it can be used on heat pump or heat transformer mode according to the available heat source.

The performance of the absorption heat pump is indicated by the coefficient of performance (COP). The COP is the ratio of the removed (for refrigeration) or provided (for heating) heat to the energy input. At present, the maximum temperature of its output does not exceed 150 °C. The temperature rise ΔT is generally 30–50 °C. The cooling performance coefficient is 0.8 to 1.6, the heating performance coefficient is 1.2 to 2.5, and the heat transfer performance coefficient is 0.4 to 0.5.

When they are applied in industry, the absorption heat pumps should be properly placed in terms of energy and they must satisfy the limitations of special features of the surroundings.

== AHP types ==
=== Type 1: conventional heat pumps ===
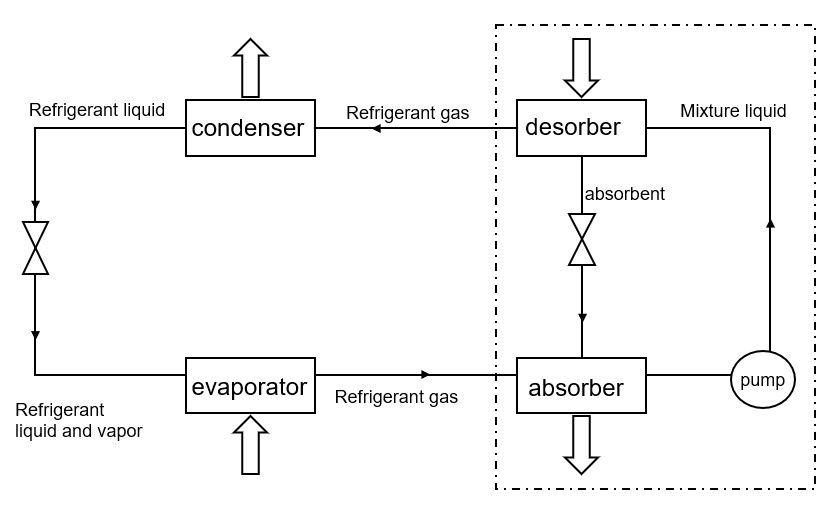
Absorption heat pump configuration (type 1 refrigeration)

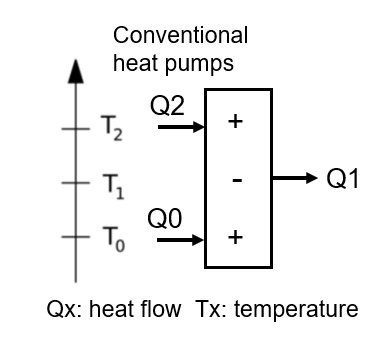
Absorption heat pump temperature (type 1); Q2-driving high temperature flow (desorber); Q0-low temperature flow (evaporator); Q1-intermediate heat flow (condenser).

Classified by temperature, AHPs can be divided into two categories. In type 1 AHP, the condenser temperature is higher than evaporator temperature (also referred to as heat amplifier and refrigeration). Driven by a high-temperature heat source, the first type absorption heat pump extracts the heat of waste heat and outputs a medium-temperature heat medium that is 30–60 degrees Celsius higher than the waste heat. This type is more common and could be an alternative to traditional compression machines. The coefficient of performance of the first type absorption heat pump is greater than 1, generally 1.5 to 2.5.

The heat pump is composed of the main components such as generators, condenser, evaporator, absorber and heat exchanger, as well as the suction device, shielding pump (solution pump and refrigerant pump), and other auxiliary parts. The air extraction device removes the non-condensable gas in the heat pump and keeps the heat pump always in a high vacuum state.

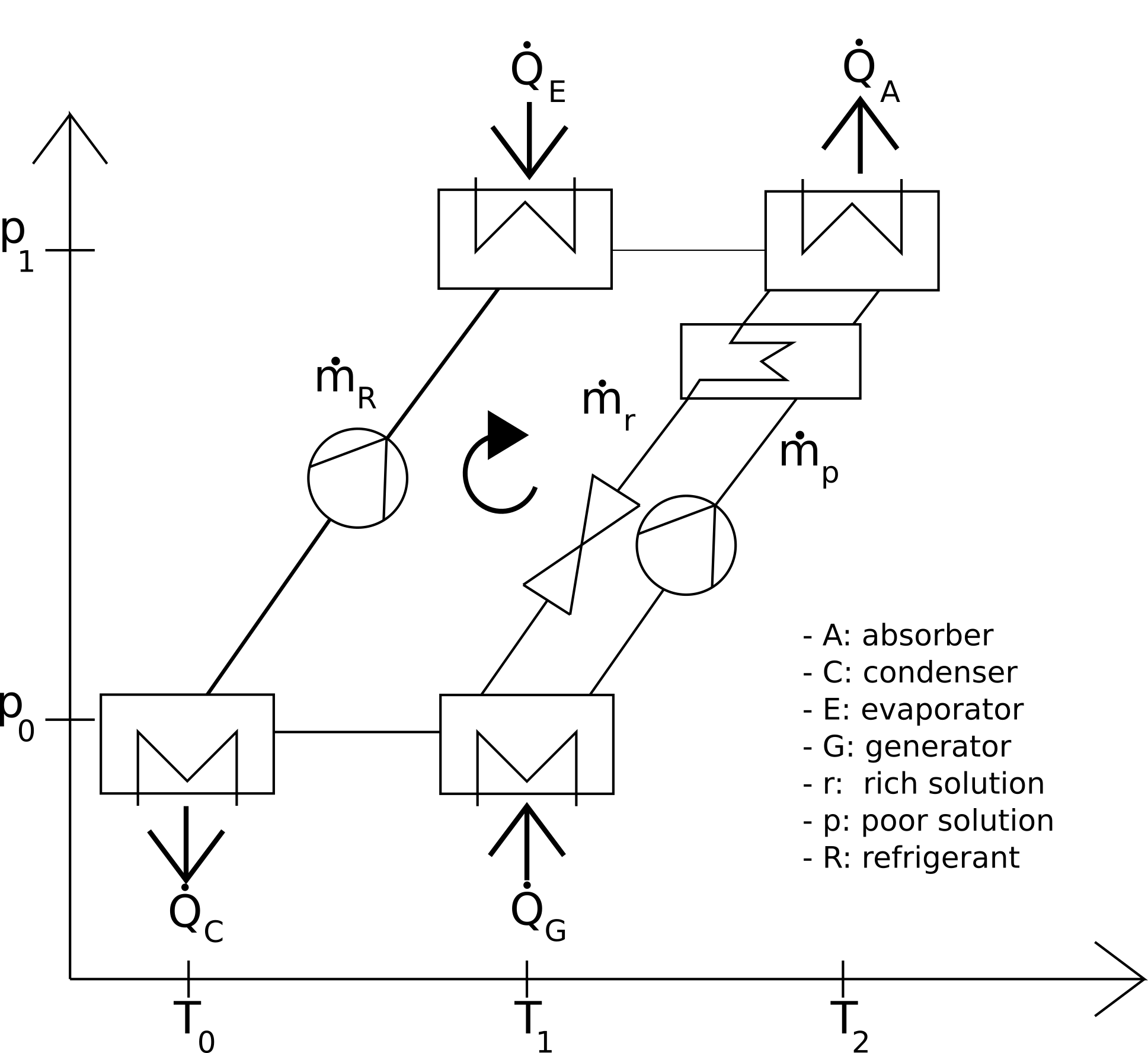
Absorption heat pump process scheme (type 2)

=== Type 2: heat transformer heat pumps ===
In type 2 AHP, condenser temperature is lower than evaporator temperature (also referred to as heat transformer). The type 2 absorption heat pump uses the heat of the medium-temperature waste heat intelligently, output high-temperature heat medium (hot water steam) 25–50 degrees Celsius higher than medium temperature waste heat. The type 2 absorption heat pump could be driven by low-grade waste heat in the production process or in nature, which can achieve energy saving and emission reduction and reduce production costs, and it has practical application in petrochemical and coal chemical industries. The coefficient of performance of the second type absorption heat pump is always less than 1, generally 0.4 to 0.5.

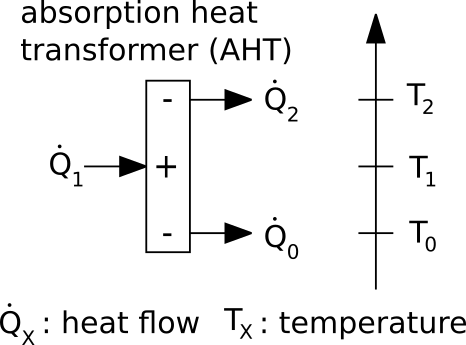
Absorption heat pump temperature (type 2); Q1-intermediate driven heat flow (evaporator); Q2-high temperature revalued flow (absorber); Q0-low temperature rejected flow (condenser).

== Typical working fluids ==
A mixture of fluid is used as the working fluid, different concentrations of the working fluid correspond to different temperatures, the temperature and concentration of working fluid undergo a cyclic change. When the generator is supplied with heat, the temperature of the mixture rises, thereby increase the concentration of high-boiling components (absorbent) and release the refrigerant. When refrigerant is mixed with refrigerant are in the absorber, heat is released. Several types of the mixture could be used in the absorption unit but water/lithium bromide and ammonia/water are the common choices.

=== Water and Lithium bromide (LiBr) ===
Ammonia and water absorption heat pump

Water is the refrigerant and LiBr the absorption medium. Water and LiBr systems have bigger capacities and are applied in a broad range in the industry, the sizes vary from tens of kW to several MW. The first type of lithium bromide absorption heat pump unit is a high-temperature heat source (steam, high-temperature hot water, fuel oil, gas) as the driving heat source, lithium bromide solution as the absorbent, and water as the refrigerant, and the low-temperature heat source (such as waste hot water) is recycled and used.

=== Ammonia and water ===
Ammonia is the refrigerant and water the absorption medium. In the absorber and generator, the absorption or effect of the ammonia aqueous solution is used to radiate heat or absorb heat. In the evaporator and condenser, the phase change of pure ammonia is used to complete the external absorption or heat release. Like a traditional heat pump, the refrigerant (ammonia) is condensed in the condenser, and heat is then released; the pressure is dropped after the expansion unit and the refrigerant is evaporated to absorb heat.

The ammonia/water heat pumps are essentially limited to residential applications because they are only commercially limited to small sizes (a few KW). If the system absorbs heat from the residential building, it works as a refrigeration machine; if it releases heat to the interior of a residential building, it heats the house.

The key component of heat pumps using ammonia and water on the market today is the generator absorber heat exchanger (GAX), which improves the thermal efficiency of the equipment by recovering the heat released when ammonia is absorbed into the water. Other innovations applied to this type of heat pump include efficient steam separation, variable ammonia flow, and variable capacity, and low-emission capacity-variable gas combustion.

== Thermal energy sources ==
=== Solar thermal ===
Single, double, or triple iterative absorption cooling cycles are used in different solar-thermal-cooling system designs. The more cycles, the more efficient they are.

In the late 19th century, the most common phase change refrigerant material for absorption cooling was a solution of ammonia and water. Today, the combination of lithium bromide and water is also in common use. One end of the system of expansion/condensation pipes is heated, and the other end gets cold enough to make ice. Originally, natural gas was used as a heat source in the late 19th century. Today, propane is used in recreational vehicle absorption refrigerators. Innovative hot water solar thermal energy collectors can also be used as the modern "free energy" heat source.

Efficient absorption refrigerators require water of at least 88 °C (190 °F). Common, inexpensive flat-plate solar thermal collectors only produce about 70 °C (160 °F) water, but several successful commercial projects in the US, Asia and Europe have shown that flat plate solar collectors specially developed for temperatures over 93 °C (200 °F) (featuring double glazing, increased backside insulation, etc.) can be effective and cost-efficient. Evacuated-tube solar panels can be used as well. Concentrating solar collectors required for absorption refrigerators are less effective in hot humid, cloudy environments, especially where the overnight low temperature and relative humidity are uncomfortably high. Where water can be heated well above 88+ °C (190 °F), it can be stored and used when the sun is not shining.

For more than 150 years, absorption refrigerators have been used to make ice. This ice can be stored and used as an "ice battery" for cooling when the sun is not shining, as it was in the 1995 Hotel New Otani Tokyo in Japan. Mathematical models are available in the public domain for ice-based thermal energy storage performance calculations.

=== Geothermal ===
Shallow groundwater has significant applications for energy use. With refrigeration technology, superheated geothermal water can be used to produce refrigerant water for air conditioning. Corresponding heat pump technology can utilize geothermal resources at various temperatures, greatly reducing energy consumption of residential and commercial buildings. The use of superheated geothermal water to drive can achieve energy-saving and economic benefits for both heating and cooling. For low-temperature heat sources driven by a small amount of high-temperature heat sources, both cold water and hot water can be prepared.

=== Natural gas ===
Natural gas is a common-used heat source, therefore, absorption heat pumps are sometimes called gas-fired heat pumps. Also, when other heat sources heat pumps (waste heat for example) are running at the heating mode, they can meet the overload heating requirements of very cold periods in an efficient manner through additional gas boilers.

=== Waste heat ===
Illustratively, the waste heat drive system may cover cooling and heating loads by operating in a cooler and heat converter mode. It is possible that only one device can provide resources to the urban area in a resource-efficient manner throughout most of the year driven by waste heat.

== See also ==
- Heat pump
- Absorption refrigerator
- Absorption heat transformer
- Solar air conditioning
