= Windhexe =

Apparatus used in waste reduction and food processing

Windhexe (German, literally: "wind witch") is a grinding and dehydrating apparatus operated with compressed air typically used in waste reduction and food processing. The Windhexe was unveiled in 2002 and operates via compressed air injected into a conical chamber which tumbles material at high speeds causing simultaneous dehydration and disintegration. The limited application of the Windhexe is in waste reduction and in animal processing with more proposed uses being explored commercially.

== History ==
Around 1989, following his retirement, Kansas farmer Frank Polifka began work on what would become the Windhexe.

In 2002, following 13 years of work, Polifka unveiled the Windhexe to a small group of the local press.

On August 23, 2012 (14 years ago), Polifka died of natural causes in Catherine, Kansas.

As of 2013, the commercial use of the Windhexe machine was controlled by Vortex Dehydration Technology LLC, a company co-founded by Polifka. The company licensed and maintained Windhexe machines for industrial and commercial use for a per-tonne fee.

The company currently employs 12 and has an annual revenue that exceeds US$3,000,000.

== Description ==
The Windhexe operates using heated pressurized air. The pressurized air is forced into a conical chamber where it forms a high speed vortex which tumbles material against the inside wall, pulverizing it into a fine powder while simultaneously dehydrating the finished product.

Compressed air is injected at the top through nozzles. Small deflection plates then force that air to flow in a counterclockwise direction, creating a miniature tornado in the funnel-shaped can. Using just a fraction of the energy employed by conventional crushers and dryers, the Windhexe breaks solid material down to roughly micron size, increasing its surface area so that heated air can dehydrate the material quickly. The Windhexe operates without any moving parts and can quickly and loudly disintegrate and dehydrate materials ranging from shoes, rocks, sludge, concrete, and industrial waste into glass, as well as agricultural and animal waste.

== Applications ==
The patent application for the Windhexe mentions possible uses in pasteurization, desalinization of salt water, and kitchen appliances.

The Windhexe has yet to be used on a large scale industrially but it has been used in a limited capacity in an array of applications. Windhexe is currently being used to process collagen powder from eggshells, creating a plentiful supply of the expensive protein that is used in cosmetics and medical procedures such as skin grafts. The Windhexe is also being used to dry lignite coal in Australia, a process by which impurities are removed from the coal pre-burn producing a cleaner burning fuel.

=== Waste reduction ===
One of the main uses of the Windhexe is in solid waste reduction. The Windhexe processes materials to take up as little as 1/10th of the original volume. The Windhexe is currently being used for this purpose in several large industrial plants throughout the west coast. This process can be done without the use of heat in the compressed air because waste reduction does not typically need the dehydration feature of the Windhexe.

=== Animal processing ===
Animal processing was one of the first proposed uses of the Windhexe. The machine can take the remains from meat processing plants, trimmed waste and animal parts that are typically thrown away, and produce what Vortex Dehydration Technology calls highly nutritional "edible systems", such as bouillon, powdered extracts and flavorings, and dried soups. This differs from the current process, which only uses non waste animal products to create edible systems, since it allows parts now classified as waste to be used commercially.
