= Chapman–Enskog theory =

Statistical mechanics framework

Chapman–Enskog theory provides a framework in which equations of hydrodynamics for a gas can be derived from the Boltzmann equation. The technique justifies the otherwise phenomenological constitutive relations appearing in hydrodynamical descriptions such as the Navier–Stokes equations. In doing so, expressions for various transport coefficients such as thermal conductivity and viscosity are obtained in terms of molecular parameters. Thus, Chapman–Enskog theory constitutes an important step in the passage from a microscopic, particle-based description to a continuum hydrodynamical one.

The theory is named for Sydney Chapman and David Enskog, who introduced it independently in 1916 and 1917.

== Description ==
The starting point of Chapman–Enskog theory is the Boltzmann equation for the 1-particle distribution function $f(\mathbf{r},\mathbf{v},t)$:

$$\frac{\partial f}{\partial t} +\mathbf{v} \cdot \frac{\partial f}{\partial
\mathbf{r}} + \frac{\mathbf{F}}{m} \cdot \frac{\partial f}{\partial \mathbf{v}}=\hat{C} f,$$

where $\hat{C}$ is a nonlinear integral operator which models the evolution of $f$ under interparticle collisions. This nonlinearity makes solving the full Boltzmann equation difficult, and motivates the development of approximate techniques such as the one provided by Chapman–Enskog theory.

Given this starting point, the various assumptions underlying the Boltzmann equation carry over to Chapman–Enskog theory as well. The most basic of these requires a separation of scale between the collision duration $\tau_{\mathrm c}$ and the mean free time between collisions $\tau_{\mathrm f}$: $\tau_{\mathrm c} \ll \tau_{\mathrm f}$. This condition ensures that collisions are well-defined events in space and time, and holds if the dimensionless parameter $\gamma \equiv r_{\mathrm c}^3 n$ is small, where $r_{\mathrm c}$ is the range of interparticle interactions and $n$ is the number density. In addition to this assumption, Chapman–Enskog theory also requires that $\tau_{\mathrm f}$ is much smaller than any extrinsic timescales $\tau_{\text{ext}}$. These are the timescales associated with the terms on the left hand side of the Boltzmann equation, which describe variations of the gas state over macroscopic lengths. Typically, their values are determined by initial/boundary conditions and/or external fields. This separation of scales implies that the collisional term on the right hand side of the Boltzmann equation is much larger than the streaming terms on the left hand side. Thus, an approximate solution can be found from

$$\hat{C} f = 0.$$

It can be shown that the solution to this equation is a Gaussian:

$$f=n(\mathbf{r},t)\left( \frac{m}{2\pi k_\text{B} T(\mathbf{r},t)}\right)^{3/2} \exp \left[ -\frac{m {\left| \mathbf{v}-\mathbf{v}_0 (\mathbf{r},t) \right|}^2}{2 k_\text{B} T(\mathbf{r},t)} \right],$$

where $m$ is the molecule mass and $k_\text{B}$ is the Boltzmann constant. A gas is said to be in local equilibrium if it satisfies this equation. The assumption of local equilibrium leads directly to the Euler equations, which describe fluids without dissipation, i.e. with thermal conductivity and viscosity equal to $0$. The primary goal of Chapman–Enskog theory is to systematically obtain generalizations of the Euler equations which incorporate dissipation. This is achieved by expressing deviations from local equilibrium as a perturbative series in Knudsen number $\text{Kn}$, which is small if $\tau_{\mathrm f} \ll \tau_{\text{ext}}$. Conceptually, the resulting hydrodynamic equations describe the dynamical interplay between free streaming and interparticle collisions. The latter tend to drive the gas towards local equilibrium, while the former acts across spatial inhomogeneities to drive the gas away from local equilibrium. When the Knudsen number is of the order of 1 or greater, the gas in the system being considered cannot be described as a fluid.

To first order in $\text{Kn}$ one obtains the Navier–Stokes equations. Second and third orders give rise, respectively, to the Burnett equations and super-Burnett equations.

== Mathematical formulation ==
Since the Knudsen number does not appear explicitly in the Boltzmann equation, but rather implicitly in terms of the distribution function and boundary conditions, a dummy variable $\varepsilon$ is introduced to keep track of the appropriate orders in the Chapman–Enskog expansion:

$$\frac{\partial f}{\partial t}+\mathbf{v\cdot }\frac{\partial f}{\partial \mathbf{r}}+\frac{\mathbf{F}}{m}\cdot \frac{\partial f}{\partial \mathbf{v}}=\frac{1}{\varepsilon} \hat{C} f.$$

Small $\varepsilon$ implies the collisional term $\hat{C} f$ dominates the streaming term $\mathbf{v\cdot}\frac{\partial f}{\partial\mathbf{r}}+\frac{\mathbf{F}}{m}\cdot\frac{\partial f}{\partial \mathbf{v}}$, which is the same as saying the Knudsen number is small. Thus, the appropriate form for the Chapman–Enskog expansion is

$$f=f^{(0)}+\varepsilon f^{(1)}+\varepsilon^2 f^{(2)}+\cdots \ .$$

Solutions that can be formally expanded in this way are known as normal solutions to the Boltzmann equation. This class of solutions excludes non-perturbative contributions (such as $e^{-1/\varepsilon}$), which appear in boundary layers or near internal shock layers. Thus, Chapman–Enskog theory is restricted to situations in which such solutions are negligible.

Substituting this expansion and equating orders of $\varepsilon$ leads to the hierarchy

$$\begin{align}
J(f^{(0)},f^{(0)}) &=0 \\
2J(f^{(0)},f^{(n)}) &=\left(\frac{\partial }{\partial t}+\mathbf{v\cdot }\frac{\partial }{\partial \mathbf{r}}+\frac{\mathbf{F}}{m}\cdot \frac{\partial }{\partial \mathbf{v}} \right) f^{(n-1)}
-\sum_{m=1}^{n-1}J(f^{(m)},f^{(n-m)}), \qquad n > 0,
\end{align}$$

where $J$ is an integral operator, linear in both its arguments, which satisfies $J(f,g) = J(g,f)$ and $J(f,f) = \hat{C}f$. The solution to the first equation is a Gaussian:

$$f^{(0)} = n'(\mathbf{r},t) \left( \frac{m}{2\pi k_\text{B} T'(\mathbf{r},t)}\right)^{3/2} \exp \left[ -\frac{m\left| \mathbf{v} - \mathbf{v}'_0(\mathbf{r},t)\right|^2}{2k_\text{B} T'(\mathbf{r},t)}\right].$$

for some functions $n'(\mathbf{r},t)$, $\mathbf{v}'_{0}(\mathbf{r},t)$, and $T'(\mathbf{r},t)$. The expression for $f^{(0)}$ suggests a connection between these functions and the physical hydrodynamic fields defined as moments of $f(\mathbf{r},\mathbf{v},t)$:

$$\begin{align}
n(\mathbf{r},t) &= \int f(\mathbf{r},\mathbf{v},t) \, d\mathbf{v} \\
n(\mathbf{r},t)\mathbf{v}_0 (\mathbf{r},t) &= \int \mathbf{v} f(\mathbf{r},\mathbf{v},t)  \, d\mathbf{v} \\
n(\mathbf{r},t)T(\mathbf{r},t) &= \int \frac{m}{3k_\text{B}} v^2 f(\mathbf{r},\mathbf{v},t) \, d\mathbf{v}.
\end{align}$$

From a purely mathematical point of view, however, the two sets of functions are not necessarily the same for $\varepsilon > 0$ (for $\varepsilon = 0$ they are equal by definition). Indeed, proceeding systematically in the hierarchy, one finds that similarly to $f^{(0)}$, each $f^{(n)}$ also contains arbitrary functions of $\mathbf{r}$ and $t$ whose relation to the physical hydrodynamic fields is a priori unknown. One of the key simplifying assumptions of Chapman–Enskog theory is to assume that these otherwise arbitrary functions can be written in terms of the exact hydrodynamic fields and their spatial gradients. In other words, the space and time dependence of $f$ enters only implicitly through the hydrodynamic fields. This statement is physically plausible because small Knudsen numbers correspond to the hydrodynamic regime, in which the state of the gas is determined solely by the hydrodynamic fields. In the case of $f^{(0)}$, the functions $n'(\mathbf{r},t)$, $\mathbf{v}'_{0}(\mathbf{r},t)$, and $T'(\mathbf{r},t)$ are assumed exactly equal to the physical hydrodynamic fields.

While these assumptions are physically plausible, there is the question of whether solutions which satisfy these properties actually exist. More precisely, one must show that solutions exist satisfying

$$\begin{align}
\int \sum_{n=1}^\infty \varepsilon^n f^{(n)} \, d\mathbf{v}= 0 = \int \sum_{n=1}^\infty \varepsilon^{n}f^{(n)}\mathbf{v}^2 \, d\mathbf{v} \\[1ex]
\int \sum_{n=1}^\infty \varepsilon^n f^{(n)} v_i \, d\mathbf{v} = 0, \qquad i \in \{x,y,z\}.
\end{align}$$

Moreover, even if such solutions exist, there remains the additional question of whether they span the complete set of normal solutions to the Boltzmann equation, i.e. do not represent an artificial restriction of the original expansion in $\varepsilon$. One of the key technical achievements of Chapman–Enskog theory is to answer both of these questions in the positive. Thus, at least at the formal level, there is no loss of generality in the Chapman–Enskog approach.

With these formal considerations established, one can proceed to calculate $f^{(1)}$. The result is

$$f^{(1)}=\left[ -\frac{1}{n}\left( \frac{2k_\text{B} T}{m}\right)^{1/2} \mathbf{A}(\mathbf{v}) \cdot \nabla \ln T - \frac{2}{n} \mathbb{B(\mathbf{v})\colon \nabla }\mathbf{v}_{0} \right] f^{(0)},$$

where $\mathbf{A}(\mathbf{v})$ is a vector and $\mathbb{B}(\mathbf{v})$ a tensor, each a solution of a linear inhomogeneous integral equation that can be solved explicitly by a polynomial expansion. Here, the colon denotes the double dot product, $\mathbb{T} : \mathbb{T'} = \sum_{i,j} T_{ij} T'_{ji}$ for tensors $\mathbb{T}$, $\mathbb{T'}$.

== Predictions ==
To first order in the Knudsen number, the heat flux $\mathbf{q} = \frac{m}{2} \int f(\mathbf{r},\mathbf{v},t) \, v^2 \mathbf{v} \, d\mathbf{v}$ is found to obey Fourier's law of heat conduction,

$$\mathbf{q} = -\lambda \nabla T,$$

and the momentum-flux tensor $\mathbf{\sigma} = m \int (\mathbf{v} - \mathbf{v}_0) (\mathbf{v} - \mathbf{v}_0)^\mathsf{T} f(\mathbf{r},\mathbf{v},t) \, d\mathbf{v}$ is that of a Newtonian fluid,

$$\mathbf{\sigma} = p \mathbb{I} - \mu \left( \nabla \mathbf{v_0} + (\nabla \mathbf{v_0})^\mathsf{T} \right) + \frac{2}{3}\mu (\nabla \cdot \mathbf{v_0}) \mathbb{I},$$

with $\mathbb{I}$ the identity tensor. Here, $\lambda$ and $\mu$ are the thermal conductivity and viscosity. They can be calculated explicitly in terms of molecular parameters by solving a linear integral equation; the table below summarizes the results for a few important molecular models ($m$ is the molecule mass and $k_\text{B}$ is the Boltzmann constant).

Table 1: Predicted expressions for thermal conductivity and viscosity.
Model	$\mu$	$\lambda$	Notes
Rigid elastic spheres of diameter $\sigma$	$1.016 \cdot \frac{5}{16 \sigma^2} \left(\frac{k_\text{B} m T}{\pi}\right)^{1/2}$	$2.522 \cdot \frac{3}{2} \frac{k_\text{B}}{m} \cdot \mu$	Correct to 3 decimal places.
Molecules with repulsive force $\kappa / r^{\nu}$	$\frac{5}{8}\frac{1}{A_2(\nu) \Gamma{\left(4 - \frac{2}{\nu - 1}\right)}} \left(\frac{k_\text{B} m T}{\pi}\right)^{1/2}\left(\frac{2k_\text{B} T}{\kappa}\right)^{2/(\nu-1)}$	$\frac{15}{4} \frac{k_\text{B}}{m} \cdot \mu$	$\Gamma$ denotes the gamma function, and $A_2(\nu)$ is a numerical factor. Chapman and Cowling list several values of the latter, e.g. $A_2(5) = 0.436$ and $A_2(11) = 0.319$.
Lennard-Jones potential: $V(r) = 4\varepsilon \left[ {\left(\frac \sigma r\right)}^{12} - {\left(\frac \sigma r\right)}^6 \right]$	$\frac{5}{16 \sigma^2} \left(\frac{k_\text{B} m T}{\pi}\right)^{1/2} \cdot \frac{1}{\mathcal{W}_1^{(2)}(2)}$	$\frac{15}{4}\frac{k_\text{B}}{m} \cdot \mu$	$\mathcal{W}_1^{(2)}(2)$ is a function of $k_\text{B} T / \varepsilon$ which can be calculated numerically. It varies from $5.682$ for $k_\text{B} T / \varepsilon = 0.3$ to $1.1738$ for $k_\text{B} T / \varepsilon = 100$.

With these results, it is straightforward to obtain the Navier–Stokes equations. Taking velocity moments of the Boltzmann equation leads to the exact balance equations for the hydrodynamic fields $n(\mathbf{r},t)$, $\mathbf{v}_0(\mathbf{r},t)$, and $T(\mathbf{r},t)$:

$$\begin{align}
\frac{\partial n}{\partial t}+\nabla \cdot\left( n\mathbf{v}_0\right) &= 0 \\
\frac{\partial \mathbf{v}_0}{\partial t}+ \mathbf{v}_0\cdot \nabla \mathbf{v}_0-\frac{\mathbf{F}}{m}+\frac{1}{n}\nabla \cdot \mathbf{\sigma} &= 0  \\
\frac{\partial T}{\partial t}+\mathbf{v}_0\cdot \nabla T+\frac{2}{3k_\text{B} n}\left( \mathbf{\sigma} : \nabla \mathbf{v}_0+\nabla \cdot \mathbf{q}\right) &= 0.
\end{align}$$

As in the previous section, the colon denotes the double dot product, $\mathbb{T} : \mathbb{T'} = \sum_{i,j} T_{ij} T'_{ji}$. Substituting the Chapman–Enskog expressions for $\mathbf{q}$ and $\sigma$, one arrives at the Navier–Stokes equations.

=== Comparison with experiment ===
An important prediction of Chapman–Enskog theory is that viscosity, $\mu$, is independent of density (this can be seen for each molecular model in table 1, but is actually model-independent). This counterintuitive result traces back to James Clerk Maxwell, who inferred it in 1860 on the basis of more elementary kinetic arguments. It is well-verified experimentally for gases at ordinary densities.

Table 2: Experimentally measured values of $f = \lambda / \mu c_v$ for the first five noble gases.
Helium	2.45
Neon	2.52
Argon	2.48
Krypton	2.535
Xenon	2.58

On the other hand, the theory predicts that $\mu$ does depend on temperature. For rigid elastic spheres, the predicted scaling is $\mu \propto T^{1/2}$, while other models typically show greater variation with temperature. For instance, for molecules repelling each other with force $\propto r^{-\nu}$ the predicted scaling is $\mu \propto T^s$, where $s = 1/2 + 2/(\nu - 1)$. Taking $s = 0.668$, corresponding to $\nu \approx 12.9$, shows reasonable agreement with the experimentally observed scaling for helium. For more complex gases the agreement is not as good, most likely due to the neglect of attractive forces. Indeed, the Lennard-Jones model, which does incorporate attractions, can be brought into closer agreement with experiment (albeit at the cost of a more opaque $T$ dependence; see the Lennard-Jones entry in table 1). For better agreement with experimental data than that which has been obtained using the Lennard-Jones model, the more flexible Mie potential has been used, the added flexibility of this potential allows for accurate prediction of the transport properties of mixtures of a variety of spherically symmetric molecules.

Chapman–Enskog theory also predicts a simple relation between thermal conductivity, $\lambda$, and viscosity, $\mu$, in the form $\lambda = f \mu c_v$, where $c_v$ is the specific heat at constant volume and $f$ is a purely numerical factor. For spherically symmetric molecules, its value is predicted to be very close to $2.5$ in a slightly model-dependent way. For instance, rigid elastic spheres have $f \approx 2.522$, and molecules with repulsive force $\propto r^{-13}$ have $f \approx 2.511$ (the latter deviation is ignored in table 1). The special case of Maxwell molecules (repulsive force $\propto r^{-5}$) has $f = 2.5$ exactly. Since $\lambda$, $\mu$, and $c_v$ can be measured directly in experiments, a simple experimental test of Chapman–Enskog theory is to measure $f$ for the spherically symmetric noble gases. Table 2 shows that there is reasonable agreement between theory and experiment.

== Extensions ==
The basic principles of Chapman–Enskog theory can be extended to more diverse physical models, including gas mixtures and molecules with internal degrees of freedom. In the high-density regime, the theory can be adapted to account for collisional transport of momentum and energy, i.e. transport over a molecular diameter during a collision, rather than over a mean free path (in between collisions). Including this mechanism predicts a density dependence of the viscosity at high enough density, which is also observed experimentally. Obtaining the corrections used to account for transport during a collision for soft molecules (i.e. Lennard-Jones or Mie molecules) is in general non-trivial, but success has been achieved at applying Barker-Henderson perturbation theory to accurately describe these effects up to the critical density of various fluid mixtures.

One can also carry out the theory to higher order in the Knudsen number. In particular, the second-order contribution $f^{(2)}$ has been calculated by Burnett. In general circumstances, however, these higher-order corrections may not give reliable improvements to the first-order theory, due to the fact that the Chapman–Enskog expansion does not always converge. (On the other hand, the expansion is thought to be at least asymptotic to solutions of the Boltzmann equation, in which case truncating at low order still gives accurate results.) Even if the higher order corrections do afford improvement in a given system, the interpretation of the corresponding hydrodynamical equations is still debated.

=== Revised Enskog theory ===
The extension of Chapman–Enskog theory for multicomponent mixtures to elevated densities, in particular, densities at which the covolume of the mixture is non-negligible was carried out in a series of works by E. G. D. Cohen and others, and was coined Revised Enskog theory (RET). The successful derivation of RET followed several previous attempt at the same, but which gave results that were shown to be inconsistent with irreversible thermodynamics. The starting point for developing the RET is a modified form of the Boltzmann Equation for the $s$-particle velocity distribution function,

$$\left(\frac{\partial}{\partial t} + \mathbf{v}_i \cdot \frac{\partial }{\partial \mathbf{r}} + \frac{\mathbf{F}_i}{m_i}\cdot \frac{\partial}{\partial \mathbf{v}_i}\right)f_i = \sum_j S_{ij}(f_i, f_j)$$

where $\mathbf{v}_i(\mathbf{r}, t)$ is the velocity of particles of species $i$, at position $\mathbf{r}$ and time $t$, $m_i$ is the particle mass, $\mathbf{F}_i$ is the external force, and

$$S_{ij}(f_i, f_j) = \iiint \left[g_{ij}(\sigma_{ij} \mathbf{k}) \, f_i'(\mathbf{r}) \, f_j'(\mathbf{r} + \sigma_{ij} \mathbf{k}) - g_{ij}(- \sigma_{ij} \mathbf{k}) \, f_i(\mathbf{r}) \, f_j(\mathbf{r} - \sigma_{ij} \mathbf{k})\right] d \tau$$

The difference in this equation from classical Chapman–Enskog theory lies in the streaming operator $S_{ij}$, within which the velocity distribution of the two particles are evaluated at different points in space, separated by $\sigma_{ij} \mathbf{k}$, where $\mathbf{k}$ is the unit vector along the line connecting the two particles centre of mass. Another significant difference comes from the introduction of the factors $g_{ij}$, which represent the enhanced probability of collisions due to excluded volume. The classical Chapman–Enskog equations are recovered by setting $\sigma_{ij} = 0$ and $g_{ij}(\sigma_{ij} \mathbf{k}) = 1$.

A point of significance for the success of the RET is the choice of the factors $g_{ij}$, which is interpreted as the pair distribution function evaluated at the contact distance $\sigma_{ij}$. An important factor to note here is that in order to obtain results in agreement with irreversible thermodynamics, the $g_{ij}$ must be treated as functionals of the density fields, rather than as functions of the local density.

==== Results from Revised Enskog theory ====
One of the first results obtained from RET that deviates from the results from the classical Chapman–Enskog theory is the Equation of State. While from classical Chapman–Enskog theory the ideal gas law is recovered, RET developed for rigid elastic spheres yields the pressure equation

$$\frac{p}{nkT} = 1 + \frac{2 \pi n}{3} \sum_i \sum_j x_i x_j \sigma_{ij}^3 g_{ij} ,$$

which is consistent with the Carnahan-Starling Equation of State, and reduces to the ideal gas law in the limit of infinite dilution (i.e. when $n \sum_{i,j} x_i x_j \sigma_{ij} ^3 \ll 1$)

For the transport coefficients: viscosity, thermal conductivity, diffusion and thermal diffusion, RET provides expressions that exactly reduce to those obtained from classical Chapman–Enskog theory in the limit of infinite dilution. However, RET predicts a density dependence of the thermal conductivity, which can be expressed as

$$\lambda = (1 + n \alpha_{\lambda}) \lambda_0 + n^2 T^{1 / 2} \lambda_{\sigma}$$

where $\alpha_{\lambda}$ and $\lambda_\sigma$ are relatively weak functions of the composition, temperature and density, and $\lambda_0$ is the thermal conductivity obtained from classical Chapman–Enskog theory.

Similarly, the expression obtained for viscosity can be written as

$$\mu = (1 + n T \alpha_{\mu} ) \mu_0 + n^2 T^{1 / 2} \mu_{\sigma}$$

with $\alpha_{\mu}$ and $\mu_{\sigma}$ weak functions of composition, temperature and density, and $\mu_0$ the value obtained from classical Chapman–Enskog theory.

For diffusion coefficients and thermal diffusion coefficients the picture is somewhat more complex. However, one of the major advantages of RET over classical Chapman–Enskog theory is that the dependence of diffusion coefficients on the thermodynamic factors, i.e. the derivatives of the chemical potentials with respect to composition, is predicted. In addition, RET does not predict a strict dependence of

$$D \sim \frac{1}{n}, \quad D_T \sim \frac{1}{n}$$

for all densities, but rather predicts that the coefficients will decrease more slowly with density at high densities, which is in good agreement with experiments. These modified density dependencies also lead RET to predict a density dependence of the Soret coefficient,

$$S_T = \frac{D_T}{D}, \quad \left( \frac{\partial S_T}{\partial n} \right)_{T} \neq 0  ,$$

while classical Chapman–Enskog theory predicts that the Soret coefficient, like the viscosity and thermal conductivity, is independent of density.

==== Applications ====
While Revised Enskog theory provides many advantages over classical Chapman–Enskog theory, this comes at the price of being significantly more difficult to apply in practice. While classical Chapman–Enskog theory can be applied to arbitrarily complex spherical potentials, given sufficiently accurate and fast integration routines to evaluate the required collision integrals, Revised Enskog Theory, in addition to this, requires knowledge of the contact value of the pair distribution function.

For mixtures of hard spheres, this value can be computed without large difficulties, but for more complex intermolecular potentials it is generally non-trivial to obtain. However, some success has been achieved at estimating the contact value of the pair distribution function for Mie fluids (which consists of particles interacting through a generalised Lennard-Jones potential) and using these estimates to predict the transport properties of dense gas mixtures and supercritical fluids.

Applying RET to particles interacting through realistic potentials also exposes one to the issue of determining a reasonable "contact diameter" for the soft particles. While these are unambiguously defined for hard spheres, there is still no generally agreed upon value that one should use for the contact diameter of soft particles.

== See also ==
- Transport phenomena
- Kinetic theory of gases
- Boltzmann equation
- Navier–Stokes equations
- Fourier's law
- Newtonian fluid
