= Coomber =

Coomber is a surname. Notable people with the surname include:

- Alex Coomber (born 1973), English skeleton racer
- Margaret Coomber (born 1950), British middle-distance runner
- Trevor Coomber (born 1949), Australian politician

== See also ==
- Coomber's relationship, in physical chemistry
