= Walter H. Stockmayer =

American chemist

- Born: Walter Hugo Stockmayer; July 4, 1914; Rutherford, New Jersey
- Died: September 5, 2004 (aged 90); Norwich, Vermont
- Education: Massachusetts Institute of Technology
- Known for: Stockmayer potential Flory–Stockmayer theory
- Awards: William Procter Prize (1993); Oesper Award (1992); National Medal of Science (1987); Peter Debye Award (1974); Guggenheim Fellowship (1954)
- Scientific career
- Fields: Physical chemistry of polymers

Walter Hugo Stockmayer (April 7, 1914, in Rutherford, New Jersey – May 9, 2004, in Norwich, Vermont) was an internationally known chemist and university teacher. A former member of the National Academy of Sciences, he was recognized as one of the twentieth century pioneers of polymer science. His specific interest was in theory and experiment for the structure and dynamics of polymer molecules, including various uses of the light scattering method.

Stockmayer became interested in the mathematical aspects of physical chemistry as an undergraduate at MIT. A Rhodes Scholarship brought him to Jesus College, Oxford, where he undertook gas kinetics research with D. L. Chapman. He introduced the Stockmayer potential.

Stockmayer returned to MIT for Ph.D. research and pursued his study of statistical mechanics, which he later continued at Columbia University. He returned again to MIT in 1943 to study the theory of network formation and the gelation criterion. Stockmayer increasingly directed his attention to theories of polymer solutions, light scattering and chain dynamics.

After a Guggenheim Fellowship for the academic year 1954/1955 in Strasbourg, France, he returned once more to MIT, then moved to Dartmouth College in 1961. There, he worked primarily on copolymers in dilute solution, established the journal Macromolecules, and collaborated with many Japanese scientists.

Stockmayer is mentioned as a friend of the author in the novel Breakfast of Champions by Kurt Vonnegut, and is described as a distinguished pianist and a good skier. A fellowship in honor of Professor Stockmayer was established at Dartmouth College in 1994.

== See also ==
- Multiangle light scattering
- Percolation theory
