= Burnett equations =

Equations of motion for flows

In continuum mechanics, a branch of mathematics, the Burnett equations are a set of higher-order continuum equations for non-equilibrium flows and the transition regimes where the Navier–Stokes equations do not perform well.

They were derived by the English mathematician D. Burnett.

== Series expansion ==
=== Series expansion approach ===
The series expansion technique used to derive the Burnett equations involves expanding the distribution function $f$ in the Boltzmann equation as a power series in the Knudsen number $\mathrm{Kn}$:

$$f(r,c,t) = f^{(0)}(c|n,u,T) \left[1 + \mathrm{Kn} \phi^{(1)}(c|n,u,T) + \mathrm{Kn}^2 \phi^{(2)}(c|n,u,T) + \cdots \right]$$
Here, $f^{(0)}(c|n,u,T)$ represents the Maxwell-Boltzmann equilibrium distribution function, dependent on the number density $n$, macroscopic velocity $u$, and temperature $T$. The terms $\phi^{(1)}, \phi^{(2)},\dots$ are higher-order corrections that account for non-equilibrium effects, with each subsequent term incorporating higher powers of the Knudsen number.

=== Derivation ===
The first-order term $f^{(1)}$ in the expansion gives the Navier-Stokes equations, which include terms for viscosity and thermal conductivity. To obtain the Burnett equations, one must retain terms up to second order, corresponding to $\phi^{(2)}$. The Burnett equations include additional second-order derivatives of velocity, temperature, and density, representing more subtle effects of non-equilibrium gas dynamics.

The Burnett equations can be expressed as:

$$\mathbf{u}_t + (\mathbf{u} \cdot \nabla)\mathbf{u} + \nabla p = \nabla \cdot (\nu \nabla \mathbf{u}) + \text{higher-order terms}$$

Here, the higher-order terms involve second-order gradients of velocity and temperature, which are absent in the Navier-Stokes equations. These terms become significant in situations with high Knudsen numbers, where the assumptions of the Navier-Stokes framework break down.

== Extensions ==
The Onsager-Burnett Equations, commonly referred to as OBurnett, which form a superset of the Navier-Stokes equations and are second-order accurate for Knudsen number.

$$\sqrt{\tau} \frac{du^s}{ds} - \frac{9}{8} \alpha_1 u^* {\left(\frac{du^*}{ds}\right)}^2 = \frac{\tau}{u^*} - \tau_0 -1 + u^*$$	1

$$\frac{45}{16} \sqrt{\tau} \frac{d \tau}{ds} + \frac{9}{4} \gamma_1 \tau {\left(\frac{du^*}{ds}\right)}^2 -  \frac{9}{4} \Psi u^* \frac{d \tau}{ds} \frac{du^*}{ds} = \frac{3}{2} (\tau - \tau_0) - \frac{1}{2} {\left(1 - u^*\right)}^2 - \tau_0(1-u^*)$$	2

== Derivation ==
Starting with the Boltzmann equation

$$\frac{\partial{f}}{\partial{t}} + c_k \partial{f}{x_k} + F_k \partial{f}{c_k} = J(f, f_1)$$

== See also ==
- Fluid dynamics
- Lars Onsager
- Non-dimensionalization and scaling of the Navier–Stokes equations
- Stokes equations
- Chapman–Enskog theory
- Navier–Stokes equations
