= Intramolecular force =

Type of atomic bonding

An intramolecular force (from Latin intra- 'within') is any force that binds together the atoms making up a molecule. Intramolecular forces are stronger than the intermolecular forces that govern the interactions between molecules.

== Types ==
The classical model identifies three main types of chemical bonds — ionic, covalent, and metallic — distinguished by the degree of charge separation between participating atoms. The characteristics of the bond formed can be predicted by the properties of constituent atoms, namely electronegativity. They differ in the magnitude of their bond enthalpies, a measure of bond strength, and thus affect the physical and chemical properties of compounds in different ways. % of ionic character is directly proportional difference in electronegativity of bonded atom.

=== Ionic bond ===
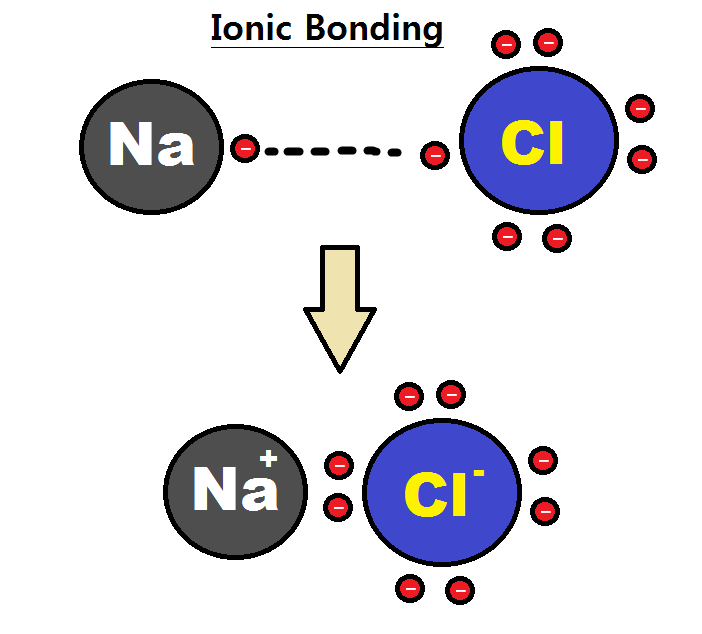
Ionic bonding between sodium and chlorine

An ionic bond can be approximated as complete transfer of one or more valence electrons of atoms participating in bond formation, resulting in a positive ion and a negative ion bound together by electrostatic forces. Electrons in an ionic bond tend to be mostly found around one of the two constituent atoms due to the large electronegativity difference between the two atoms, generally more than 1.9, (greater difference in electronegativity results in a stronger bond); this is often described as one atom donating electrons to the other. This type of bond is generally formed between a metal and nonmetal, such as sodium and chlorine in NaCl. Sodium would give an electron to chlorine, forming a positively charged sodium ion and a negatively charged chloride ion.

=== Covalent bond ===
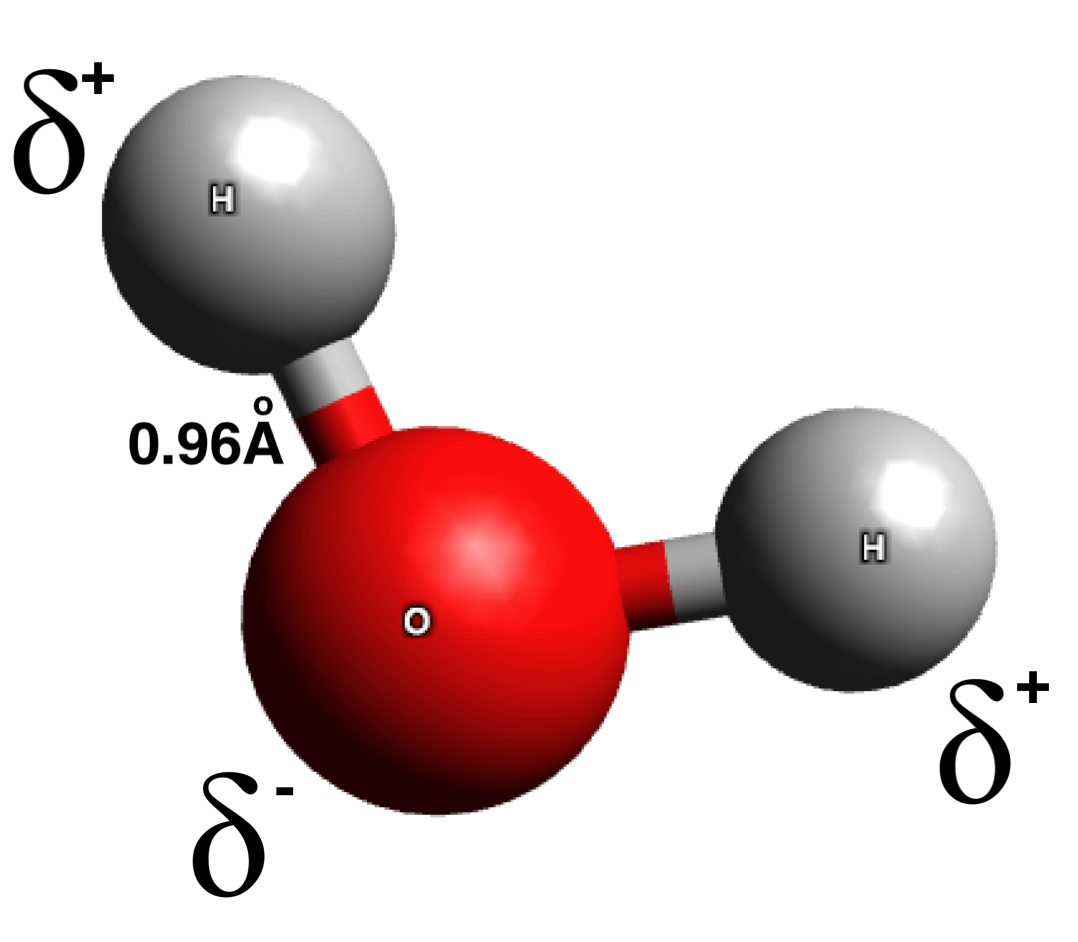
This is a ball and stick model of a water molecule.

In a true covalent bond, the electrons are uniformly shared between the two atoms of the bond; there is little or no charge separation. Covalent bonds are generally formed between two nonmetals. There are several types of covalent bonds: in polar covalent bonds, electrons are more likely to be found around one of the two atoms, whereas in nonpolar covalent bonds, electrons are evenly shared. Homonuclear diatomic molecules are purely covalent. The polarity of a covalent bond is determined by the electronegativities of each atom and thus a polar covalent bond has a dipole moment pointing from the partial positive end to the partial negative end. Polar covalent bonds represent an intermediate type in which the electrons are neither completely transferred from one atom to another nor evenly shared.

=== Metallic bond ===
Metallic bonds generally form within a pure metal or metal alloy. Metallic electrons are generally delocalized; the result is a large number of free electrons around positive nuclei, sometimes called an electron sea.

== Bond formation ==

Comparison of the bond lengths between carbon and oxygen in a double and triple bond.

Bonds are formed by atoms so that they are able to achieve a lower energy state. Free atoms will have more energy than a bonded atom. This is because some energy is released during bond formation, allowing the entire system to achieve a lower energy state. The bond length, or the minimum separating distance between two atoms participating in bond formation, is determined by their repulsive and attractive forces along the internuclear direction. As the two atoms get closer and closer, the positively charged nuclei repel, creating a force that attempts to push the atoms apart. As the two atoms get further apart, attractive forces work to pull them back together. Thus an equilibrium bond length is achieved and is a good measure of bond stability.

== Biochemistry ==
The alpha helix structure necessary for the stability of DNA is held together by the electrostatic intramolecular forces in the molecule.

Intramolecular forces are extremely important in the field of biochemistry, where it comes into play at the most basic levels of biological structures. Intramolecular forces such as disulfide bonds give proteins and DNA their structure. Proteins derive their structure from the intramolecular forces that shape them and hold them together. The main source of structure in these molecules is the interaction between the amino acid residues that form the foundation of proteins. The interactions between residues of the same proteins forms the secondary structure of the protein, allowing for the formation of beta sheets and alpha helices, which are important structures for proteins and in the case of alpha helices, for DNA.

== See also ==
- Chemical bond
- Intermolecular force
