= Pair potential =

Potential energy of two interacting objects as a function of their distance

In physics, a pair potential is a function that describes the potential energy of two interacting objects solely as a function of the distance between them.

Some interactions, like Coulomb's law in electrodynamics or Newton's law of universal gravitation in mechanics naturally have this form for simple spherical objects. For other types of more complex interactions or objects it is useful and common to approximate the interaction by a pair potential, for example interatomic potentials in physics and computational chemistry that use approximations like the Lennard-Jones and Morse potentials.

== Functional form ==
The total energy of a system of $N$ objects at positions $\vec{R}_i$, that interact through pair potential $v$ is given by

$$E=\frac12\sum_{i = 1}^N\sum_{j\neq i}^Nv\left(\left|\vec{R}_i - \vec{R}_j\right|\right)\ .$$

Equivalently, this can be expressed as

$$E=\sum_{i = 1}^N\sum_{j = i + 1}^Nv\left(\left|\vec{R}_i - \vec{R}_j\right|\right)\ .$$

This expression uses the fact that interaction is symmetric between particles $i$ and $j$. It also avoids self-interaction by not including the case where $i = j$.

== Potential range ==
A fundamental property of a pair potential is its range. It is expected that pair potentials go to zero for infinite distance as particles that are too far apart do not interact. In some cases the potential goes quickly to zero and the interaction for particles that are beyond a certain distance can be assumed to be zero, these are said to be short-range potentials. Other potentials, like the Coulomb or gravitational potential, are long range: they go slowly to zero and the contribution of particles at long distances still contributes to the total energy.

== Computational cost ==
The total energy expression for pair potentials is quite simple to use for analytical and computational work. It has some limitations however, as the computational cost is proportional to the square of number of particles. This might be prohibitively expensive when the interaction between large groups of objects needs to be calculated.

For short-range potentials the sum can be restricted only to include particles that are close, reducing the cost to linearly proportional to the number of particles.

== Infinitely periodic systems ==
In some cases it is necessary to calculate the interaction between an infinite number of particles arranged in a periodic pattern.

== Beyond pair potentials ==
An example of a potential energy function that is not a pair potential is the three-body Axilrod-Teller potential. Another example is the Stillinger-Weber potential for silicon, which includes the angle in a triangle of silicon atoms as an input parameter.

== Common pair potentials ==
Some commonly used pair potentials are listed below.

- Hard Sphere potential
- Sutherland potential
- Buckingham (or exp-6) potential
- Mie potential
- Lennard-Jones (12-6) potential
- Stockmayer potential
- Coulomb potential
- Yukawa potential
- Morse potential
- Steele (10-4-3) potential
