= Richard Buckingham =

British computer scientist (1911–1994)

Richard Arthur Buckingham
- Born: 17 July 1911; Norwich
- Died: 13 August 1994 (aged 83); Portsmouth
- Education: St John's College, Cambridge
- Scientific career
- Fields: particle physics, mathematics, computer science
- Doctoral advisor: Ralph H. Fowler
- Doctoral students: Alexander Dalgarno

Richard Arthur Buckingham FBCS FRSA (17 July 1911 – 13 August 1994) was an English particle physicist, mathematician and computer scientist long on the staff of the University of London.

He was also a Fellow of the British Computer Society and of the Royal Society of Arts and chaired the Technical Committee for Education (TC3) of the International Federation for Information Processing. He was also the originator of the Buckingham potential formula.

== Early life ==
Buckingham was the son of George Herbert Buckingham, by his marriage to Alice Mary Watson King. He was educated at Gresham's School, Holt, and St John's College, Cambridge (BA 1935, PhD 1937). His thesis on "Some problems arising from the interactions of atoms with atoms, electrons and radiation" was done under Ralph H. Fowler.

== Career ==
After Cambridge, Buckingham's first academic post was at Queen's University Belfast, where he was an assistant lecturer in Mathematical Physics from 1935 to 1938. In 1938 he published a paper titled 'The classical equation of state of gaseous Helium, Neon and Argon', which proposed a formula which became known as the Buckingham potential. The same year, he took up a new post as Senior 1851 Exhibitioner at University College London, before serving in the Royal Navy's Admiralty Research Laboratory, Teddington, and in the Mine Design Department at Havant, from 1940 to 1945. After the Second World War, he became an academic of University College London, where he was a lecturer in mathematics (1945–1950), a lecturer in physics (1950–1951), and a reader in physics (1951–1957). From 1957 to 1973 he was director of the University of London's Computer Unit, which during his tenure was renamed as the Institute of Computer Science.

In 1962 the International Federation for Information Processing created a new Technical Committee for Education called TC3, the first ever international body dealing with computing and education, and in 1963 Buckingham was appointed to chair it. He commented "It was inevitable that education should come to the fore early in the development of IFIP". The first meeting took place in February 1964, in Paris.

In 1963 Buckingham was appointed as professor of computing science, and in 1974 as professor of computer education, at Birkbeck College, London. On his retirement in 1978 he received the title of professor emeritus.

== Private life ==
In 1939 Buckingham married Christina O'Brien, and they had one son and two daughters. He died on 13 August 1994 in West Sussex.

== Selected publications ==
- The Low-temperature Properties of Gaseous Helium: 2, 1941
- Numerical Methods (Pitman), 1957
- Information Systems Education, 1987
- Papers in Proceedings of the Royal Society, Proceedings of the Physical Society, Journal of Chemical Physics, Computer Journal, and others.
