= Gustav Mie =

German physicist (1868–1957)

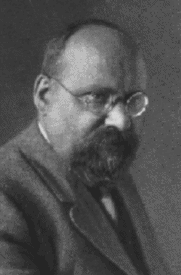
- Born: Gustav Adolf Feodor Wilhelm Ludwig Mie; 29 September 1868; Rostock, Grand Duchy of Mecklenburg-Schwerin, North German Confederation
- Died: 13 February 1957 (aged 88); Freiburg, Baden-Württemberg, West Germany
- Education: University of Rostock (no degree); University of Heidelberg (doctorate, 1892); University of Göttingen (Dr. habil., 1897)
- Known for: Describing the Mie potential (1903); Formulating the Mie–Grüneisen equation of state (1903); Describing Mie scattering (1908); Initiating the classical unified field theories (1912)
- Awards: Ackermann–Teubner Memorial Award (1920)
- Scientific career
- Fields: Physics
- Workplaces: University of Greifswald (1902–1917); University of Halle-Wittenberg (1917–1924); University of Freiburg (1924–1935)
- Thesis: Zum Fundamentalsatz über die Existenz von Integralen partieller Differentialgleichungen (1892)
- Doctoral advisor: Leo Königsberger

Gustav Adolf Feodor Wilhelm Ludwig Mie (German: [ˈɡʊstaf ˈmiː]; 29 September 1868 – 13 February 1957) was a German physicist. His work included Mie scattering, the Mie potential, the Mie–Grüneisen equation of state and an early effort at classical unified field theories.

== Life ==
Mie was born in Rostock, Mecklenburg-Schwerin, Germany in 1868. From 1886 he studied mathematics and physics at the University of Rostock. In addition to his major subjects, he also attended lectures in chemistry, zoology, geology, mineralogy and astronomy, as well as logic and metaphysics. In 1889 he continued his studies at the University of Heidelberg and received a doctoral degree in mathematics in 1892 (at the age of 22). His thesis is titled Zum Fundamentalsatz über die Existenz von Integralen partieller Differentialgleichungen (On the fundamental theorem on the existence of integrals of partial differential equations) and his supervisor was Leo Königsberger.

In 1897 he got his habilitation at the University of Göttingen in theoretical physics and in 1902 became extraordinary professor for theoretical physics at the University of Greifswald. In 1917 he became full professor for experimental physics at Martin Luther University of Halle-Wittenberg. In 1924 he became professor at the University of Freiburg, where he worked up to his retirement in 1935.

In Freiburg, during the Nazi dictatorship, Mie was member of the university opposition of the so-called "Freiburger Kreis" (Freiburg Circles) and one of the participants of the original "Freiburger Konzil".

He died at Freiburg im Breisgau in 1957.

== Work ==
During his Greifswald years Mie worked on the computation of scattering of an electromagnetic wave by a homogeneous dielectric sphere, which was published in 1908 under the title of "Contributions to the optics of turbid media, particularly of colloidal metal solutions" in Annalen der Physik. The term Mie scattering is still related to his name. Using Maxwell's electromagnetic theory applied to spherical gold particles Mie provided a theoretical treatment of plasmon resonance absorption of gold colloids. The sharp absorption bands depend on the particle size and explain the change in colour that occurs as the size of the colloid nanoparticles is increased from 20 to 1600 nm. He wrote further important contributions to electromagnetism and also to relativity theory. In addition he was employed on measurements units and finally developed his Mie system of units in 1910 with the basic units volt, ampere, coulomb and second (VACS-system).

In 1912 and 1913 Mie published the first attempt at a unified theory of matter in the 20th century. His motivation was to explain the "invisible" electron and relate gravitation to matter; his theory had three core assumptions: 1) electrical and magnetic fields exist inside of electrons, 2) special relativity, and 3) new states of ether would be sufficient to explain all phenomenon of the material world.

== Honors ==
A crater on Mars was named in his honor, and also a building of the University of Freiburg as well as a lecture hall at the Martin Luther University of Halle Wittenberg, where he first became a full professor, carries his name. The Gustav Mie Prize is awarded annually to outstanding bachelor's degree students in physics or medical physics at Martin Luther University of Halle Wittenberg.

== Selected publications ==
- Moleküle, Atome, Weltäther. Teubner-Verlag, 1904.
- Moleküle, atome, Weltäther (Molecules, atoms, etheric world). BG Teubner, 1907.
- Die Einsteinsche Gravitationstheorie (Einstein's theory of gravitation). S. Hirzel, 1921.
- Die geistige Struktur der Physik. Gütersloh, 1934.
- Die göttliche Ordnung in der Natur. Furche-Verlag, 1946.
- Lehrbuch der Elektrizität und des Magnetismus. F. Enke, 1910; Enke-Verlag, 1943; Enke-Verlag, 1948.
- Die Grundlagen der Mechanik. Enke-Verlag, 1950.
- "Beiträge zur Optik trüber Medien, speziell kolloidaler Metallösungen" [Contributions to the optics of turbid media, particularly of colloidal metal solutions]. Annalen der Physik (in German). 25 (IV): 377–445. 1908. Bibcode:1908AnP...330..377M. doi:10.1002/andp.19083300302.

== See also ==
- Classical unified field theories
- Representative layer theory
