= Coomber's relationship =

Coomber's relationship can be used to describe how the internal pressure and dielectric constant of a non-polar liquid are related.

As $p_i=\left(\frac{\partial E}{\partial V}\right)_T\,$, which defines the internal pressure of a liquid, it can be found that: $p_i = n \cdot I \cdot b(T) \frac{N^2\alpha^2}{V^{n+1}}$ where

- $N$ is equal to the number of molecules
- $I$ is the ionization potential of the liquid
- $b(T)$ is a temperature dependent relation based on numerical constants of the pair summation from inter-particle geometry
- $\alpha$ is the polarizability
- $V$ is the volume of the liquid

where for most non-polar liquids $n=1$
