= Protein pKa calculations =

In computational biology, protein pK_{a} calculations are used to estimate the pK_{a} values of amino acids as they exist within proteins. These calculations complement the pK_{a} values reported for amino acids in their free state, and are used frequently within the fields of molecular modeling, structural bioinformatics, and computational biology.

== Amino acid pK_{a} values ==
pK_{a} values of amino acid side chains play an important role in defining the pH-dependent characteristics of a protein. The pH-dependence of the activity displayed by enzymes and the pH-dependence of protein stability, for example, are properties that are determined by the pK_{a} values of amino acid side chains.

The pK_{a} values of an amino acid side chain in solution is typically inferred from the pK_{a} values of model compounds (compounds that are similar to the side chains of amino acids). See Amino acid for the pK_{a} values of all amino acid side chains inferred in such a way. There are also numerous experimental studies that have yielded such values, for example by use of NMR spectroscopy.

The table below lists the model pK_{a} values that are often used in a protein pK_{a} calculation, and contains a third column based on protein studies.

Amino Acid	pK_{a}	pK_{a}
Asp (D)	3.9	4.0
Glu (E)	4.3	4.4
Arg (R)	12.0	13.5
Lys (K)	10.5	10.4
His (H)	6.08	6.8
Cys (C) (–SH)	8.28	8.3
Tyr (Y)	10.1	9.6
N-term		8.0
C-term		3.6

== The effect of the protein environment ==
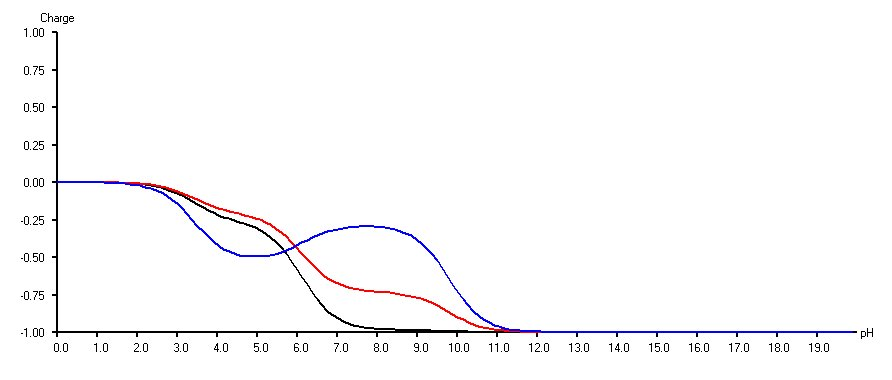
Coupled system consisting of three acids. The blue curve shows a back-titration event

When a protein folds, the titratable amino acids in the protein are transferred from a solution-like environment to an environment determined by the 3-dimensional structure of the protein. For example, in an unfolded protein, an aspartic acid typically is in an environment which exposes the titratable side chain to water. When the protein folds, the aspartic acid could find itself buried deep in the protein interior with no exposure to solvent.

Furthermore, in the folded protein, the aspartic acid will be closer to other titratable groups in the protein and will also interact with permanent charges (e.g. ions) and dipoles in the protein. All of these effects alter the pK_{a} value of the amino acid side chain, and pK_{a} calculation methods generally calculate the effect of the protein environment on the model pK_{a} value of an amino acid side chain.

Typically, the effects of the protein environment on the amino acid pK_{a} value are divided into pH-independent effects and pH-dependent effects. The pH-independent effects (desolvation, interactions with permanent charges and dipoles) are added to the model pK_{a} value to give the intrinsic pK_{a} value. The pH-dependent effects cannot be added in the same straightforward way and have to be accounted for using Boltzmann summation, Tanford–Roxby iterations or other methods.

The interplay of the intrinsic pK_{a} values of a system with the electrostatic interaction energies between titratable groups can produce quite spectacular effects such as non-Henderson–Hasselbalch titration curves and even back-titration effects.

The image on the right shows a theoretical system consisting of three acidic residues. One group is displaying a back-titration event (blue group).

== pK_{a} calculation methods ==
Several software packages and webserver are available for the calculation of protein pK_{a} values.

Note that the pK^{HH}_{a} value does in general depend on the pH value. This dependence is small for weakly interacting groups like well solvated amino acid side chains on the protein surface, but can be large for strongly interacting groups like those buried in enzyme active sites or integral membrane proteins.

While many protein pKa prediction methods are available, their accuracies often differ significantly due to subtle and often drastic differences in strategy.

=== Using the Poisson–Boltzmann equation ===
Some methods are based on solutions to the Poisson–Boltzmann equation (PBE), often referred to as FDPB-based methods (FDPB stands for "finite difference Poisson–Boltzmann"). The PBE is a modification of Poisson's equation that incorporates a description of the effect of solvent ions on the electrostatic field around a molecule.

The H++ web server, the pKD webserver, MCCE2, Karlsberg+, PETIT and GMCT use the FDPB method to compute pK_{a} values of amino acid side chains.

FDPB-based methods calculate the change in the pK_{a} value of an amino acid side chain when that side chain is moved from a hypothetical fully solvated state to its position in the protein. To perform such a calculation, one needs theoretical methods that can calculate the effect of the protein interior on a pK_{a} value, and knowledge of the pKa values of amino acid side chains in their fully solvated states.

=== Empirical methods ===
A set of empirical rules relating the protein structure to the pK_{a} values of ionizable residues have been developed by Li, Robertson, and Jensen. These rules form the basis for the web-accessible program called PROPKA for rapid predictions of pK_{a} values. A recent empirical pK_{a} prediction program was released by Tan KP et.al. with the online server DEPTH web server.

=== Molecular dynamics (MD)-based methods ===
Molecular dynamics methods of calculating pK_{a} values make it possible to include full flexibility of the titrated molecule.

Molecular dynamics based methods are typically much more computationally expensive, and not necessarily more accurate, ways to predict pK_{a} values than approaches based on the Poisson–Boltzmann equation. Limited conformational flexibility can also be realized within a continuum electrostatics approach, e.g., for considering multiple amino acid sidechain rotamers. In addition, current commonly used molecular force fields do not take electronic polarizability into account, which could be an important property in determining protonation energies.

=== From titration curves ===
From the titration of protonatable group, one can read the so-called pK_{a}^{1/2} which is equal to the pH value where the group is half-protonated (i.e. when 50% such groups would be protonated). The pK_{a}^{1/2} is equal to the Henderson–Hasselbalch pK_{a} (pK^{HH}_{a}) if the titration curve follows the Henderson–Hasselbalch equation. Most pK_{a} calculation methods silently assume that all titration curves are Henderson–Hasselbalch shaped, and pK_{a} values in pK_{a} calculation programs are therefore often determined in this way. In the general case of multiple interacting protonatable sites, the pK_{a}^{1/2} value is not thermodynamically meaningful. In contrast, the Henderson–Hasselbalch pK_{a} value can be computed from the protonation free energy via

$$\mathrm{p}K_{\mathrm{a}}^{\mathrm{HH}}(\mathrm{pH}) =
\mathrm{pH} - \frac{\Delta G^{\mathrm{prot}}(\mathrm{pH})}{\mathrm{RT} \ln10}$$

and is thus in turn related to the protonation free energy of the site via

$$\Delta G^{\mathrm{prot}}(\mathrm{pH}) = \mathrm{RT} \ln10 \; ( \mathrm{pH} - \mathrm{p}K_{\mathrm{a}}^{\mathrm{HH}} )$$

The protonation free energy can in principle be computed from the protonation probability of the group ⟨x⟩(pH) which can be read from its titration curve

$$\Delta G^{\mathrm{prot}}(\mathrm{pH}) = -\mathrm{RT}\ln\left[ \frac{\langle x \rangle}{1-\langle x \rangle} \right]$$

Titration curves can be computed within a continuum electrostatics approach with formally exact but more elaborate analytical or Monte Carlo (MC) methods, or inexact but fast approximate methods. MC methods that have been used to compute titration curves are Metropolis MC or Wang–Landau MC. Approximate methods that use a mean-field approach for computing titration curves are the Tanford–Roxby method and hybrids of this method that combine an exact statistical mechanics treatment within clusters of strongly interacting sites with a mean-field treatment of intercluster interactions.

=== From free energy calculation ===
In practice, it can be difficult to obtain statistically converged and accurate protonation free energies from titration curves if ⟨x⟩ is close to a value of 1 or 0. In this case, one can use various free energy calculation methods to obtain the protonation free energy.

To obtain the free energy, one starts with a collection of states generated by some type of simulation of the residue being protonated; this can be obtained via molecular dynamics or metropolis MC (including the biased metropolis MC and many other variants). A second algorithm then looks at these states to calculate the change in free energy before and after protonation. Methods for calculating the free energy change from an ensemble of states that have been applied to pK_{a} calculation include:

- Free-energy perturbation;
- Thermodynamic integration;
- The non-equilibrium work method;
- Bennett acceptance ratio method; and
- Nonequilibrium alchemical calculation.
