= VOTCA =

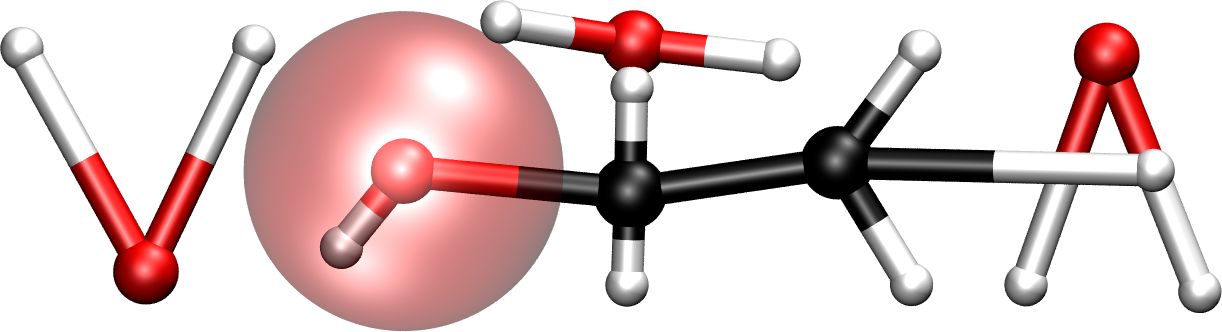
- Original author(s): Victor Rühle, Christoph Junghans, Alexander Lukyanov, Kurt Kremer, Denis Andrienko
- Developer(s): Max Planck Institute for Polymer Research; Los Alamos National Laboratory; Beckman Institute for Advanced Science and Technology; Eindhoven University of Technology
- Initial release: 2008; 17 years ago
- Stable release: 1.6.4 / 12 January 2021; 4 years ago
- Preview release: 2021.rc.1 / 15 January 2021; 4 years ago
- Repository: github.com/votca
- Written in: C++, Perl, Bash
- Operating system: Linux, macOS, Windows, any other Unix variety
- Platform: x86, x86-64
- Available in: English
- Type: Coarse-grained modeling
- License: Apache License 2.0
- Website: www.votca.org

Versatile Object-oriented Toolkit for Coarse-graining Applications (VOTCA) is a coarse-grained modeling package, which focuses on the analysis of molecular dynamics data, the development of systematic coarse-graining techniques as well as methods used for simulating microscopic charge (and exciton) transport in disordered semiconductors. It was originally developed at the Max Planck Institute for Polymer Research, and is now maintained by developers at that institute, Los Alamos National Laboratory, Eindhoven University of Technology and the Beckman Institute for Advanced Science and Technology with contributions from researcher worldwide.

== Features ==
VOTCA has 3 major parts, the Coarse-graining toolkit (VOTCA-CSG), the Charge Transport toolkit (VOTCA-CTP) and the Excitation Transport Toolkit (VOTCA-XTP). All of them are based on the VOTCA Tools library, which implements shared procedures.

=== Coarse-graining toolkit (VOTCA-CSG) ===
VOTCA-CSG supports a variety of different coarse-graining methods, including (iterative) Boltzmann Inversion, Inverse Monte Carlo, Force Matching (also known as the multiscale coarse-graining method) and the Relative entropy method, and hybrid combinations of those, as well as optimization-driven approaches, like simplex and CMA. To gather statistics VOTCA-CSG can use multiple molecular dynamics package incl. GROMACS, DL_POLY, ESPResSo, ESPResSo++, LAMMPS and HOOMD-blue for sampling.

=== Charge Transport toolkit (VOTCA-CTP) ===
VOTCA-CTP is a module, which does molecular orbital overlap calculations and can evaluate energetic disorder and electronic couplings needed to estimate charge transport properties.

=== Excitation Transport toolkit (VOTCA-XTP) ===
VOTCA-XTP is an extension to VOTCA-CTP, allowing to simulate excitation transport and properties. Therefore, it provides its own implementation of GW-BSE and a basic DFT implementation, employing localized basissets. Polarized QM/MM calculations for excited states are provided in the Thole framework. It features an interface to the Quantum Chemistry package ORCA for large scale production runs.

== Release names ==
Major releases have names assigned to them:

- 1.1 SuperAnn
- 1.2 SuperDoris
- 1.3 SuperUzma
- 1.4 SuperKurt - on the occasion of Kurt Kremer's 60th birthday
- 1.5 SuperVictor - named after Victor Rühle, one of the original core developers
- 1.6 SuperPelagia
- 1.6.2 SuperGitta

== See also ==
- GROMACS
- MARTINI
- OpenMM
