= Christoph Junghans =

German computer physicist and academic

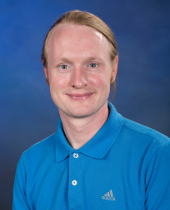
- Christoph Junghans, Computational Physicist at Los Alamos National Laboratory
- Born: 1982 (age 43–44); Merseburg
- Education: Leipzig University Johannes Gutenberg University Mainz
- Known for: VOTCA
- Spouse: Ann Junghans
- Scientific career
- Workplaces: Los Alamos National Laboratory; Max Planck Institute for Polymer Research; IBM; Forschungszentrum Jülich
- Thesis: Between the Scales: Water from different Perspectives (2010)
- Doctoral advisor: Kurt Kremer
- Other academic advisors: Wolfhard Janke, Arthur F. Voter
- Website: m.lanl.gov/junghans, compphys.de

Christoph Junghans is a German-born American computational physicist and academic, working in multiscale modeling and computational co-design. He is currently the group leader of the applied computer science group at Los Alamos National Laboratory.

== Career ==
Born in Merseburg, he was educated at Leipzig University and the Johannes Gutenberg University Mainz (PhD, 2010). During his graduate studies he also worked at Forschungszentrum Jülich and the IBM Systems & Technology Group. Junghans joined Los Alamos National Laboratory in 2011 as a PostDoc of theoretical division and became a staff member with the applied computer science group in 2014. After being the deputy group leader for 2.5 years, he became the group leader of the applied computer science group in 2021. Until his naturalization he was one of the very few foreign national managers at Los Alamos National Laboratory.

Junghans is one of the authors of the VOTCA package and a contributor to more than a hundred open-sources projects including Gromacs, LAMMPS and Gentoo Linux. His most-cited publications concern multi-scale modeling and understanding of polymer aggregation through Monte Carlo as well as method development for molecular dynamics in general.

== Personal life ==
He is married to Ann Junghans.
