= PLUMED =

- Developers: Max Bonomi, Giovanni Bussi, Carlo Camilloni, Gareth Tribello
- Release: 2009; 17 years ago
- Stable release: 2.10.1 / July 1, 2026; 2 months ago
- Written in: C++ (bindings also available for C, Fortran, and Python)
- Operating system: Linux, macOS
- Type: Molecular dynamics
- License: GNU LGPL
- Website: www.plumed.org
- Repository: github.com/plumed/plumed2

PLUMED is an open-source library implementing enhanced-sampling algorithms, various free-energy methods, and analysis tools for molecular dynamics simulations. It is designed to be used together with ACEMD, AMBER, DL_POLY, GROMACS, LAMMPS, NAMD, OpenMM, ABIN, CP2K, i-PI, PINY-MD, and Quantum ESPRESSO, but it can also be used together with analysis and visualization tools VMD, HTMD, and OpenPathSampling.

In addition, PLUMED can be used as a standalone tool for analysis of molecular dynamics trajectories. A graphical user interface named METAGUI is available.

== Collective variables ==
PLUMED offers a large collection of collective variables that serve as descriptions of complex processes that occur during molecular dynamics simulations, for example angles, positions, distances, interaction energies, and total energy.
