= Local elevation =

Local elevation is a technique used in computational chemistry or physics, mainly in the field of molecular simulation (including molecular dynamics (MD) and Monte Carlo (MC) simulations). It was developed in 1994 by Huber, Torda and van Gunsteren to enhance the searching of conformational space in molecular dynamics simulations and is available in the GROMOS software for molecular dynamics simulation (since GROMOS96). The method was, together with the conformational flooding method, the first to introduce memory dependence into molecular simulations. Many recent methods build on the principles of the local elevation technique, including the Engkvist-Karlström, adaptive biasing force, Wang–Landau, metadynamics, adaptively biased molecular dynamics, adaptive reaction coordinate forces, and local elevation umbrella sampling methods. The basic principle of the method is to add a memory-dependent potential energy term in the simulation so as to prevent the simulation to revisit already sampled configurations, which leads to the increased probability of discovering new configurations. The method can be seen as a continuous variant of the Tabu search method.

== Algorithm ==
=== Basic step ===
The basic step of the algorithm is to add a small, repulsive potential energy function to the current configuration of the molecule such as to penalize this configuration and increase the likelihood of discovering other configurations. This requires the selection of a subset $\mathbf{Q}(\mathbf{r})$ of the degrees of freedom, which define the relevant conformational variables. These are typically a set of conformationally relevant dihedral angles, but can in principle be any differentiable function of the cartesian coordinates $\mathbf{r}$.

The algorithm deforms the physical potential energy surface by introducing a bias energy, such that the total potential energy is defined as

$$U_{tot}(\mathbf{r})=U_{phys}(\mathbf{r}) +U_{bias}^{LE}(\mathbf{Q};t)$$

The local elevation bias $U_{bias}^{LE}(\mathbf{Q};t)$ depends on the simulation time $t$ and is set to zero at the start of the simulation ($U_{bias}^{LE}(\mathbf{Q};t=0) = 0$) and is gradually built as a sum of small, repulsive functions, giving

$$U_{bias}^{LE}(\mathbf{Q};(n+1)\Delta t) = U_{bias}^{LE}(\mathbf{Q};n \Delta t) + k_{LE} F(\mathbf{Q}-\mathbf{Q}_{n+1})$$,

where $k_{LE}$ is a scaling constant and $F(\mathbf{Q}-\mathbf{Q}_{n+1})$ is a multidimensional, repulsive function with $F(0)=1$.

The resulting bias potential will be a sum of all the added functions

$$U_{bias}^{LE}(\mathbf{Q};n\Delta t) = \sum_{i=1}^{n} k_{LE} F(\mathbf{Q}-\mathbf{Q}_i)$$

To reduce the number of added repulsive functions, a common approach is to add the functions to grid points. The original choice of $F(\mathbf{Q}-\mathbf{Q}_i)$ is to use a multidimensional Gaussian function. However, due to the infinite range of the Gaussian as well as the artifacts that can occur with a sum of gridded Gaussians, a better choice is to apply multidimensional truncated polynomial functions .

== Applications ==
The local elevation method can be applied to free energy calculations as well as to conformational searching problems. In free energy calculations the local elevation technique is applied to level out the free energy surface along the selected set of variables. It has been shown by Engkvist and Karlström that the bias potential built by the local elevation method will approximate the negative of the free energy surface. The free energy surface can therefore be approximated directly from the bias potential (as done in the metadynamics method) or the bias potential can be used for umbrella sampling (as done in metadynamics with umbrella sampling corrections and local elevation umbrella sampling methods) to obtain more accurate free energies.
