= MARTINI =

Martini is a coarse-grained (CG) force field developed by Marrink and coworkers at the University of Groningen, initially developed in 2004 for molecular dynamics simulation of lipids, later (2007) extended to various other molecules. The force field applies a mapping of four heavy atoms to one CG interaction site and is parametrized with the aim of reproducing thermodynamic properties.

In 2021, a new version of the force field has been published, dubbed Martini 3.

== Overview ==
For the Martini force field 4 bead categories have been defined: Q (charged), P (polar), N (nonpolar), and C (apolar). These bead types are in turn split in 4 or 5 different levels, giving a total of 20 beadtypes. For the interactions between the beads, 10 different interaction levels are defined (O-IX). The beads can be used at normal size (4:1 mapping), S-size (small, 3:1 mapping) or T-size (tiny, 2:1 mapping). The S-particles are mainly used in ring structures whereas the T-particles are currently used in nucleic acids only. Bonded interactions (bonds, angles, dihedrals, and impropers) are derived from atomistic simulations of crystal structures.

== Use ==
The Martini force field has become one of the most used coarse grained force fields in the field of molecular dynamics simulations for biomolecules. The original 2004 and 2007 papers have been cited 1850 and 3400 times, respectively. The force field has been implemented in three major simulation codes: GROningen MAchine for Chemical Simulations (GROMACS), GROningen MOlecular Simulation (GROMOS), and Nanoscale Molecular Dynamics (NAMD). Notable successes are simulations of the clustering behavior of syntaxin-1A, the simulations of the opening of mechanosensitive channels (MscL) and the simulation of the domain partitioning of membrane peptides.

== Parameter sets ==
=== Lipids ===
The initial papers contained parameters for water, simple alkanes, organic solvents, surfactants, a wide range of lipids and cholesterol. They semiquantitatively reproduce the phase behavior of bilayers with other bilayer properties, and more complex bilayer behavior.

=== Proteins ===
Compatible parameters for proteins were introduced by Monticelli et al.. Secondary structure elements, like alpha helixes and beta sheets (β-sheets), are constrained. Martini proteins are often simulated in combination with an elastic network, such as Elnedyn, to maintain the overall structure. However, the use of the elastic network restricts the use of the Martini force field for the study of large conformational changes (e.g. folding). The GōMartini approach introduced by Poma et al. removes this limitation.

=== Carbohydrates ===
Compatible parameters were released in 2009.

=== Nucleic acids ===
Compatible parameters were released for DNA in 2015 and RNA in 2017.

=== Other ===
Parameters for different other molecules, including carbon nanoparticles, ionic liquids, and a number of polymers, are available from the Martini website.

== See also ==
- GROMACS
- VOTCA
- Comparison of software for molecular mechanics modeling
- Comparison of force field implementations
