= Thermodynamic integration =

Method in computational chemistry

Thermodynamic integration is a method used to compare the difference in free energy between two given macroscopic states (e.g., A and B) whose potential energies $U_A$ and $U_B$ have different dependences on the spatial coordinates. Because the free energy of a system is not simply a function of the phase space coordinates of the system, but is instead a function of the Boltzmann-weighted integral over phase space (i.e. a partition function), the free energy difference between two macroscopic states cannot be calculated directly from the potential energy of just two coordinate sets (for state A and B respectively). In thermodynamic integration, the free energy difference is calculated by defining a thermodynamic path between the states and integrating over ensemble-averaged enthalpy changes along the path. Such paths can either be real chemical processes or alchemical processes. An example alchemical process is the Kirkwood's coupling parameter method.

== Derivation ==
Consider two systems, A and B, with potential energies $U_A$ and $U_B$. The potential energy in either system can be calculated as an ensemble average over configurations sampled from a molecular dynamics or Monte Carlo simulation with proper Boltzmann weighting. Now consider a new potential energy function defined as:

$$U(\lambda) = U_A + \lambda(U_B - U_A)$$

Here, $\lambda$ is defined as a coupling parameter with a value between 0 and 1, and thus the potential energy as a function of $\lambda$ varies from the energy of system A for $\lambda = 0$ and system B for $\lambda = 1$. In the canonical ensemble, the partition function of the system can be written as:

$$Q(N, V, T, \lambda) = \sum_{s} \exp [-U_s(\lambda)/k_{B}T]$$

In this notation, $U_s(\lambda)$ is the potential energy of state $s$ in the ensemble with potential energy function $U(\lambda)$ as defined above. The free energy of this system is defined as:

$$F(N,V,T,\lambda)=-k_{B}T \ln Q(N,V,T,\lambda)$$,

If we take the derivative of F with respect to λ, we will get that it equals the ensemble average of the derivative of potential energy with respect to λ.

$$\begin{align}
\Delta F(A \rightarrow B)
&= \int_0^1 \frac{\partial F(\lambda)}{\partial\lambda} d\lambda
\\
&= -\int_0^1 \frac{k_{B}T}{Q} \frac{\partial Q}{\partial\lambda} d\lambda
\\
&= \int_0^1 \frac{k_{B}T}{Q} \sum_{s} \frac{1}{k_{B}T} \exp[- U_s(\lambda)/k_{B}T ] \frac{\partial U_s(\lambda)}{\partial \lambda} d\lambda
\\
&= \int_0^1 \left\langle\frac{\partial U(\lambda)}{\partial\lambda}\right\rangle_{\lambda} d\lambda
\\
&=  \int_0^1 \left\langle U_B(\lambda) - U_A(\lambda) \right\rangle_{\lambda} d\lambda
\end{align}$$

The change in free energy between states A and B can thus be computed from the integral of the ensemble averaged derivatives of potential energy over the coupling parameter $\lambda$. In practice, this is performed by defining a potential energy function $U(\lambda)$, sampling the ensemble of equilibrium configurations at a series of $\lambda$ values, calculating the ensemble-averaged derivative of $U(\lambda)$ with respect to $\lambda$ at each $\lambda$ value, and finally computing the integral over the ensemble-averaged derivatives.

Umbrella sampling is a related free energy method. It adds a bias to the potential energy. In the limit of an infinitely strong bias it is equivalent to thermodynamic integration.

== See also ==
- Free energy perturbation
- Bennett acceptance ratio
- Parallel tempering
