= Grace (plotting tool) =

2D graph plotting software

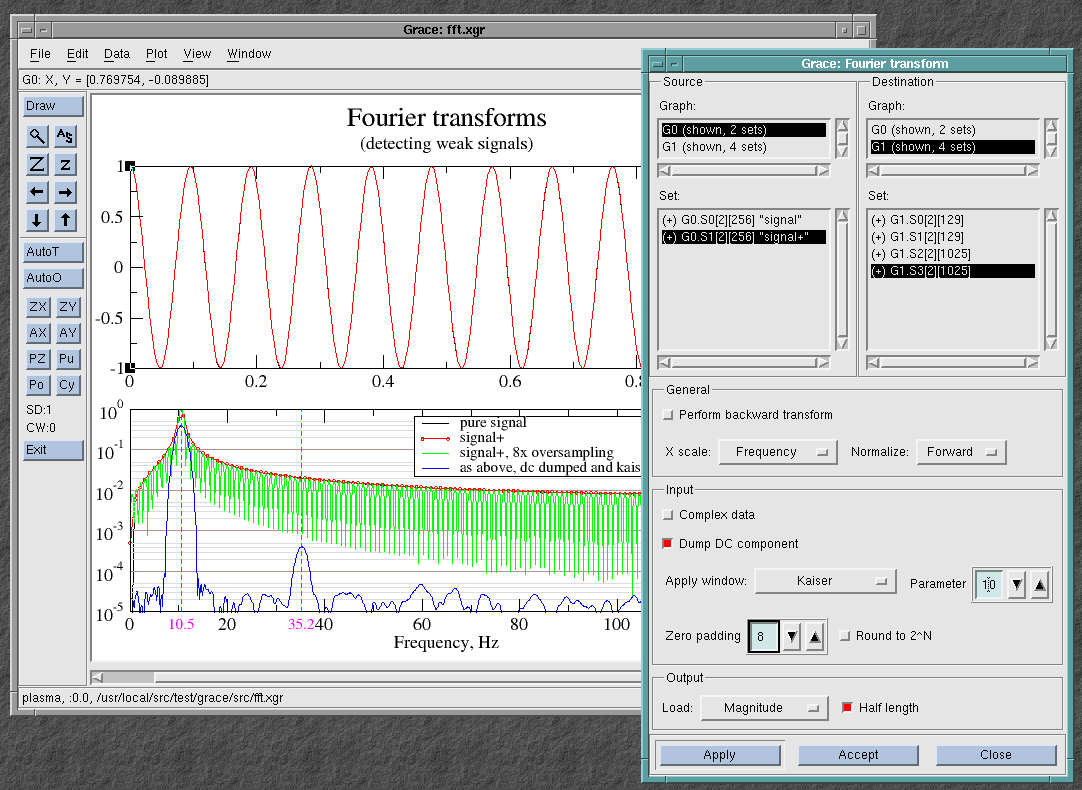
- Preview of Grace-6, showing the Fourier transform dialogue
- Original authors: Paul Turner (Xmgr); Evgeny Stambulchik (Grace)
- Developer: Grace Development Team
- Release: 1991 (Xmgr); 1998 (Grace)
- Stable release: 5.1.25 / 14 February 2015; 11 years ago
- Preview release: 5.99.1dev5 / 7 May 2007; 19 years ago
- Written in: C
- Operating system: Any Unix-like
- Available in: English
- Type: Plotting
- License: GPL
- Website: plasma-gate.weizmann.ac.il/Grace/

Grace is a free WYSIWYG 2D graph plotting tool, for Unix-like operating systems. The package name stands for "GRaphing, Advanced Computation and Exploration of data." Grace uses the X Window System and Motif for its GUI. It has been ported to VMS, OS/2, and Windows 9*/NT/2000/XP (on Cygwin). In 1996, Linux Journal described Xmgr (an early name for Grace) as one of the two most prominent graphing packages for Linux.

== History ==
Grace is a descendant of the ACE/gr plotting tool (also known as Xvgr), based on Xview libraries from OpenWindows. Xvgr was originally written by Paul Turner of Portland, Oregon, who continued development until version 4.00. In 1996, development was taken over by the ACE/gr development team, led by Evgeny Stambulchik at the Weizmann Institute of Science, Israel. Development of Xmgr was frozen at version 4.1.2 in 1998 and the Grace project was started as a fork, released under the GPL. The name stands for "GRaphing, Advanced Computation and Exploration of data" or "Grace Revamps ACE/gr" Turner still maintains a non-public version of Xmgr for internal use. The first version of Grace was numbered 5.0.0 and the latest stable version, 5.1.25 (released February 2015). Whether the development of the next major release 6.0.0 is still in progress is unclear. The latest preview versions numbered 5.99.* were released in 2007.

== Currently maintained versions ==
Noteworthy alternate versions of Grace include GraceGTK, forked from Grace 5.1.22 in 2009 by Patrick Vincent, and QtGrace, released in 2011 by Andreas Winter. Both of these versions of Grace work natively on Windows operating systems and had releases in 2022.

== Features ==
Grace can be used from a point-and-click interface or scripted (using either the built-in programming language or a number of language bindings). It performs both linear and nonlinear least-squares fitting to arbitrarily complex user-defined functions, with or without constraints. Other analysis tools include FFT, integration and differentiation, splines, interpolation, and smoothing.

== Programs using Grace ==
- GROMACS
- MOLPRO
- NAMD
- Visual Molecular Dynamics
- AptPlot

== See also ==
- List of graphing software
