= Michele Parrinello =

Italian physicist (born 1945)

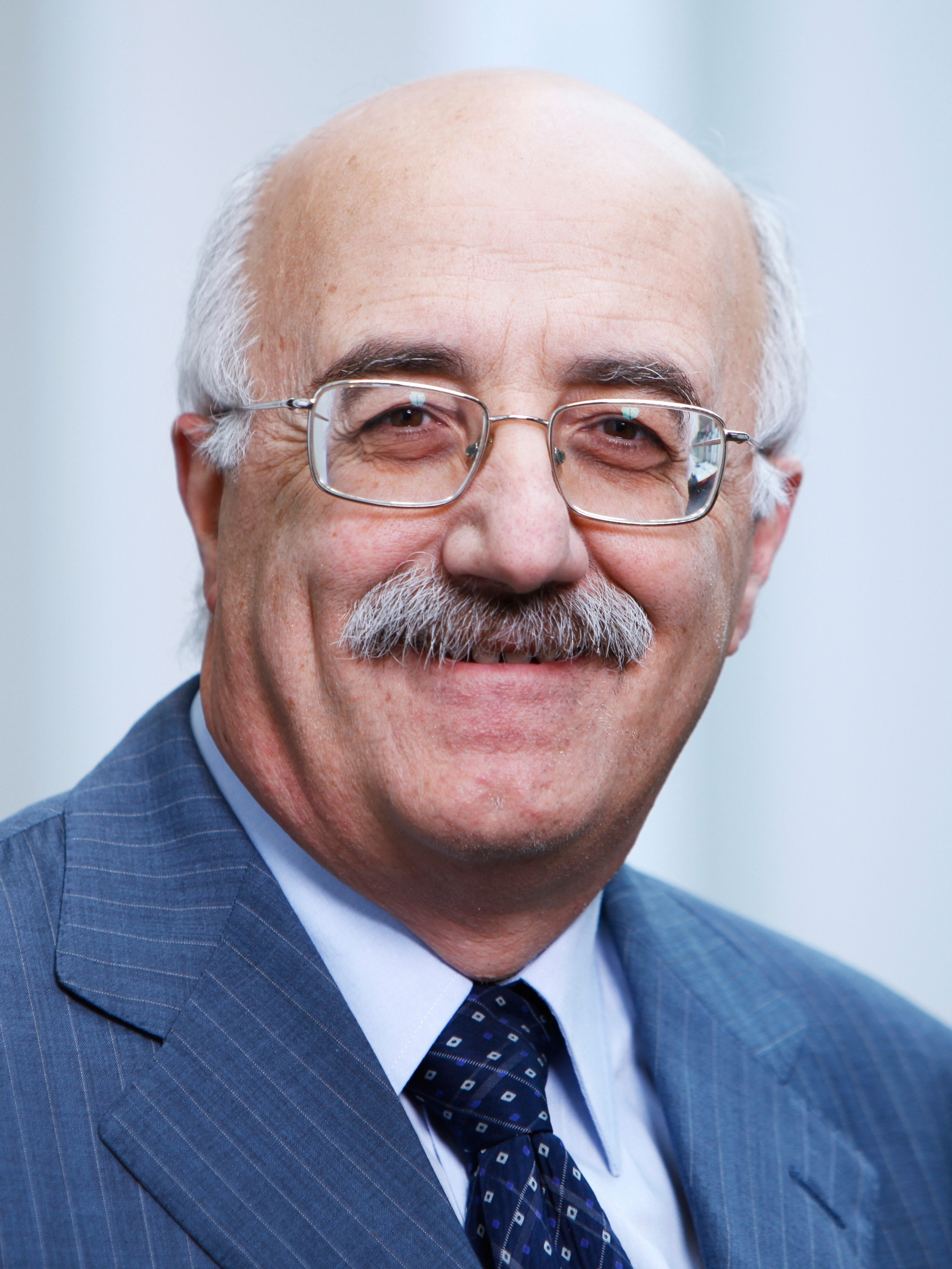
- Born: 7 September 1945 (age 81); Messina, Italy
- Awards: Fellow of the Royal Society; EPS Europhysics Prize (1990); Dirac Prize (2009); Sidney Fernbach Award (2009); Marcel Benoist Prize (2011); Dreyfus Prize in the Chemical Sciences (2017); Benjamin Franklin Medal (Franklin Institute) (2021); European Chemistry Gold Medal (2020)

Michele Parrinello (born 7 September 1945) is an Italian physicist particularly known for his work in molecular dynamics (the computer simulation of physical movements of atoms and molecules). Parrinello and Roberto Car were awarded the Dirac Medal of the International Centre for Theoretical Physics (ICTP) and the Sidney Fernbach Award in 2009 for their continuing development of the Car–Parrinello method, first proposed while working at SISSA in their seminal 1985 paper, "Unified Approach for Molecular Dynamics and Density-Functional Theory". They have continued to receive awards for this breakthrough, most recently the Dreyfus Prize in the Chemical Sciences and the 2021 Benjamin Franklin Medal in Chemistry.

Parrinello also co-authored highly cited publications on "polymorphic transitions in single crystals" and "canonical sampling through velocity rescaling."

== Life and career ==
Michele Parrinello was born in Messina (Sicily) and received his Laurea in physics from the University of Bologna in 1968. After working at the International School for Advanced Studies in Trieste, the IBM research laboratory in Zurich, and the Max Planck Institute for Solid State Research in Stuttgart, he was appointed Professor of Computational Science at the Swiss Federal Institute of Technology Zurich in 2001, a position he also holds at the Università della Svizzera italiana in Lugano. In 2004 he was elected to Great Britain's Royal Society. In 2010, he became International Member of the National Academy of Sciences. In 2011 he was awarded the Marcel Benoist Prize. Between 2014 and 2018, he was a member of the Scientific and Technical Committee of the Italian Institute of Technology (IIT). Since 2018, he has been a Senior Researcher, and since 2020, the Principal Investigator of the Atomistic Simulations research unit at the Italian Institute of Technology (IIT). In 2020 he received the Benjamin Franklin Medal (Franklin Institute) in Chemistry. As of 2024, he has received over 150,000 scientific citations and has an h-index of 163, which is one of the highest among all scientists. In Clarivate's annual list of citation laureates, Car and Parrinello have been selected as candidates for the 2024 chemistry Nobel prize.

As of 2023, at the age of 78, there are still 6 PhD students working in his group.

== Selected notable contributions ==
- Car–Parrinello molecular dynamics (the original paper on this is now the 5th most highly cited paper in Physical Review Letters)
- Parrinello–Rahman algorithm
- Flying ice cube
- Metadynamics
- Machine learning potential
