= David P. Landau =

David P. Landau (born June 22, 1941) is distinguished research professor of physics and founding director of the Center for Simulational Physics at the University of Georgia. In 1967, he received his PhD at Yale University under the direction of Werner P. Wolf. Two years later, he moved to the University of Georgia. Although intending to continue experimental research, he instead initiated high-quality Monte Carlo studies of phase transitions. He is a Fellow of the American Physical Society. He won the Aneesur Rahman Prize for Computational Physics, the highest award in computational physics given by the American Physical Society. In 2016, he received the doctor honoris causa degree from the Federal University of Minas Gerais.

== Awards ==
- Fellow of the American Physical Society
- Fellow of the Japan Society for Promotion of Science
- 1987 Jesse W. Beams Award from the Southeastern Section of the American Physical Society
- 1988 Senior U.S. Scientist Award, Alexander von Humboldt Foundation
- 2002 Aneesur Rahman Prize for Computational Physics from the American Physical Society
- 2008 Nicholson Medal for Human Outreach from the American Physical Society

== See also ==
- Wang and Landau algorithm
