= Jeremy C. Smith =

British molecular biologist

- Born: Jeremy Christopher Smith; 9 December 1959 (age 66); Norwich, England
- Citizenship: British, British
- Education: Birkbeck College, London; Leeds University
- Known for: Supercomputing applications, neutron scattering, protein dynamics, bioenergy, mercury chemistry, computational drug discovery
- Scientific career
- Workplaces: Oak Ridge National Laboratory; University of Tennessee; University of Heidelberg; Commissariat a l'Energie Atomique; Harvard University; Institut Laue-Langevin
- Thesis: Protein Dynamics Studied by Inelastic Neutron Scattering (1985)
- Doctoral advisor: John L. Finney, Stephen A. Cusack
- Website: cmb.ornl.gov

Jeremy Christopher Smith is a British-born computational molecular biophysicist.

== Early life and education ==
Smith was educated at Earlham High School, the City of Norwich School (at which his doctoral advisor, Stephen A. Cusack, was also a pupil) and Leeds University then obtained his Ph.D. in Biophysics from the University of London. Smith has a daughter.

== Career ==
After his doctoral work, Smith worked as a post-doctoral associate and lecturer at Harvard University in the group of Martin Karplus.

Smith has since built up research groups in three different countries. His first group was in Biomolecular Simulation at the Commissariat à l'énergie atomique (CEA) at Saclay, France (1989–1998). He then became the first chaired professor in computational biology in Germany, when appointed at the Interdisciplinary Center for Scientific Computing of the University of Heidelberg, Germany in 1998.

In October 2006 Smith became the first Governor's Chair at the University of Tennessee and also Director of the UT/ORNL Center for Molecular Biophysics at Oak Ridge National Laboratory. His move to Tennessee arose from the presence at ORNL of world-class supercomputing capabilities, and the Spallation Neutron Source, as the combination of neutron scattering with computer simulation has been a sustained interest of his.

In 2008, Smith was appointed Honorarprofessor (i.e., honorary professor) at the University of Heidelberg.

Smith has performed and directed research in a wide variety of fields, ranging from physics and chemistry through to practical areas such as renewable energy, environmental science and medicine. He has made advances in the high-performance computer simulation of biological macromolecules, neutron scattering in biology, the physics of proteins, enzyme catalysis, bioenergy, biomaterials, environmental biogeochemistry, and early-stage drug discovery, and in the latter his group has discovered experimentally-validated lead compounds for many different protein targets and for a variety of diseases such as diabetes, prostate cancer, Covid-19, bacterial infections and osteoporosis. His group has also contributed to the design of vaccines against Group A Streptococcus and cancer. As of 2024 Smith had published well over 500 peer-reviewed scientific articles. Several established biophysicists have worked in his group, including Benoît Roux, Frank Noé, Jerome Baudry, Frauke Graeter and Ana-Nicoleta Bondar, amongst others. He is a Fellow of the Royal Society of Chemistry.

Software created under his guidance includes Sassena, a program for computing neutron and X-ray intensities from molecular dynamics trajectories.
