= Orac (MD program) =

- Original authors: Massimo Marchi, Piero Procacci
- Developers: CEA, Saclay, Paris, FR; Florence University, IT
- Release: 1990; 36 years ago
- Stable release: 5.4.1 / 2010; 16 years ago
- Preview release: 6.0 / 2016; 10 years ago
- Written in: Fortran
- Operating system: Unix, Linux
- Platform: IA-32, x86-64, NUMA
- Available in: English
- Type: Molecular dynamics
- License: GPL
- Website: www.chim.unifi.it/orac

In computer software, Orac is a classical molecular dynamics program, to simulate complex molecular systems at the atomistic level. In 1989–1990, the code was written originally by Massimo Marchi during his stay at International Business Machines (IBM), Kingston (USA). In 1995, the code was developed further at the Centre européen de calcul atomique et moléculaire (CECAM). It is written in the programming language Fortran. In 1997, it was released under a GNU General Public License (GPL). The latest release of Orac may be run in parallel using the standard Message Passing Interface (MPI) libraries, allowing replica exchange simulations, multiple walkers metadynamics simulations and multiple steered molecular dynamics nonequilibrium trajectories.

== See also ==
- Comparison of software for molecular mechanics modeling
