= Kurt Kremer =

German physicist and university teacher

- Born: 17 June 1956 (age 70); Kapellensüng, Germany
- Education: University of Cologne
- Scientific career
- Workplaces: KFA Jülich; Exxon Research and Engineering Co., Annandale, New Jersey, US; University of Mainz; University of Minnesota, Minneapolis; UC Santa Barbara; Bayer AG, Leverkusen; Max Planck Institute for Polymer Research; University of Heidelberg; New York University; Kavli Institute for Theoretical Physics
- Thesis: Untersuchungen zur statistischen Mechanik von linearen Polymeren unter verschiedenen Bedingungen (1983)
- Doctoral advisor: Kurt Binder
- Doctoral students: Christoph Junghans

Kurt Kremer (born 17 June 1956 in Kapellensüng (Lindlar)) is a German physicist.

== Career ==
Kremer studied physics from 1974 to 1980 at the University of Cologne, where he also did his PhD in 1983 under supervision of Kurt Binder. From 1982 to 1984 he was part of the scientific staff at Forschungszentrum Jülich. Following this work he worked as a postdoc at Exxon Research and Engineering Co., Annandale, New Jersey and returned to Jülich after his Habilitation at the University of Mainz in 1988. After several research visits (e.g. at the University of Minnesota, Minneapolis and UC Santa Barbara) he left the research center when he became director and scientific member of the Max Planck Institute for Polymer Research in Mainz in 1995 (1998–2000 and 2008–2010 he was managing director).

His main research targets are theoretical physics and physical chemistry of especially biological and synthetic macromolecular materials, the development and application of (multiscale) computer simulation methods, as well as structure process property relations, morphology and dynamics of polymers, polyelectrolytes, gels, membranes, liquid crystals and peptides in bulk and under geometrical constraints and polymers for electronic applications. As of June 2015 he authored more than 260 scientific publications (ResearcherID: G-5652-2011). His most-cited paper Dynamics of entangled linear polymer melts: A molecular‐dynamics simulation, co-authored with Gary S. Grest, introduces a polymer model later to be knows as the Kremer-Grest Model.

Kremer is an elected member of the German National Academy of Sciences Leopoldina (2012), a fellow of the American Physical Society (2006) and Distinguished Professor of Materials Science and Chemical Engineering, University of Minnesota (1991). He received the Walter Schottky Prize of the German Physical Society (1992), the American Physical Society Polymer Physics Prize (2011) and an ERC-Advanced Grant (2014).
