= Desmond (software) =

Software for computational chemistry

- Developer(s): D. E. Shaw Research
- Operating system: Linux
- Platform: x86, x86-64, computer clusters
- Available in: English
- Type: Computational chemistry
- License: Proprietary freeware, commercial software
- Website: www.deshawresearch.com/resources_desmond.html, schrodinger.com/desmond

Desmond is a software package developed at D. E. Shaw Research to perform high-speed molecular dynamics simulations of biological systems on conventional computer clusters. The code uses novel parallel algorithms and numerical methods to achieve high performance on platforms containing multiple processors, but may also be executed on a single computer.

The core and source code are available at no cost for non-commercial use by universities and other not-for-profit research institutions, and have been used in the Folding@home distributed computing project. Desmond is available as commercial software through Schrödinger, Inc.

== Molecular dynamics program ==
Desmond supports algorithms typically used to perform fast and accurate molecular dynamics. Long-range electrostatic energy and forces can be calculated using particle mesh Ewald-based methods. Constraints can be enforced using the M-SHAKE algorithm. These methods can be used together with time-scale splitting (RESPA-based) integration schemes.

Desmond can compute energies and forces for many standard fixed-charged force fields used in biomolecular simulations, and is also compatible with polarizable force fields based on the Drude formalism. A variety of integrators and support for various ensembles have been implemented in the code, including methods for temperature control (Andersen thermostat, Nosé-Hoover, and Langevin) and pressure control (Berendsen, Martyna-Tobias-Klein, and Langevin). The code also supports methods for restraining atomic positions and molecular configurations; allows simulations to be carried out using a variety of periodic cell configurations; and has facilities for accurate checkpointing and restart.

Desmond can also be used to perform absolute and relative free energy calculations (e.g., free energy perturbation). Other simulation methods (such as replica exchange) are supported through a plug-in-based infrastructure, which also allows users to develop their own simulation algorithms and models.

Desmond is also available in a graphics processing unit (GPU) accelerated version that is about 60-80 times faster than the central processing unit (CPU) version.

== Related software tools ==
Along with the molecular dynamics program, the Desmond software also includes tools for minimizing and energy analysis, both of which can be run efficiently in a parallel environment.

Force fields parameters can be assigned using a template-based parameter assignment tool called Viparr. It currently supports several versions of the CHARMM, Amber and OPLS force fields, and a range of different water models.

Desmond is integrated with a molecular modeling environment (Maestro, developed by Schrödinger, Inc.) for setting up simulations of biological and chemical systems, and is compatible with Visual Molecular Dynamics (VMD) for trajectory viewing and analysis.

== See also ==
- Comparison of software for molecular mechanics modeling
