= Shuichi Nosé =

Japanese physicist (1951–2005)

- Born: June 17, 1951; Kyotango, Kyoto, Japan
- Died: August 17, 2005 (aged 54); Yokohama, Japan
- Known for: Nosé-Hoover thermostat
- Scientific career
- Fields: Physics

Shuichi Nosé (能勢 修一, Nose Shūichi; June 17, 1951 – August 17, 2005) was a Japanese physicist.

Nosé is best known for his two 1984 papers in which he proposed a method to specify the temperature of molecular dynamics simulations. This method was later improved by William G. Hoover and is known as the Nosé–Hoover thermostat.

== Publications ==
- Nosé, Shūichi (1984). "A molecular dynamics method for simulations in the canonical ensemble". Mol. Phys. 52 (2): 255. Bibcode:1984MolPh..52..255N. doi:10.1080/00268978400101201.
- Nosé, Shuichi (1984). "A unified formulation of the constant temperature molecular dynamics methods" (PDF). J. Chem. Phys. 81 (1): 511. Bibcode:1984JChPh..81..511N. doi:10.1063/1.447334. S2CID 5927579.
