= Berendsen =

Berendsen may refer to:

- Berendsen (surname)
- Berendsen plc, British company
- Berendsen thermostat
