= Herman Berendsen =

Dutch chemist (1934–2019)

- Born: 22 September 1934; Apeldoorn, the Netherlands
- Died: 7 October 2019 (aged 85); Zuidhorn, Netherlands
- Education: University of Groningen
- Known for: Berendsen thermostat GROMOS
- Scientific career
- Fields: Chemistry; Molecular dynamics
- Workplaces: University of Groningen
- Thesis: An NMR study of collagen hydration (1962)

Herman Johan Christiaan Berendsen (22 September 1934 – 7 October 2019) was a Dutch chemist. He was a professor of physical chemistry at the University of Groningen from 1967 to 1999.

== Career ==
Berendsen was born on 22 September 1934 in Apeldoorn. After high school he studied maths and physics at Utrecht University, obtaining a degree in 1957. In 1962, he obtained his PhD cum laude under Jan Kommandeur from the University of Groningen, with a dissertation titled: "An NMR study of collagen hydration". In March 1963, Berendsen was appointed lector of physical chemistry at his alma mater, and four years later became full professor. He retired in 1999. At Groningen, Berendsen was group leader of molecular dynamics.

In 1976, Berendsen and Wilfred van Gunsteren together with the 2013 Nobel Prize in Chemistry winners Martin Karplus and Michael Levitt were involved in the start of theories on molecular calculating.

Berendsen was elected a member of the Royal Netherlands Academy of Arts and Sciences in 1979. In 2013 he was awarded the Berni J. Alder Prize by the Centre européen de calcul atomique et moléculaire. The jury amongst other points praised his development of the GROningen MOlecular Simulation (GROMOS) type of force field.

Berendsen died on 7 October 2019 in Zuidhorn.

== Literature ==
Samulski, E.T. The Magical Power of Water: A Reminiscence of Herman Johan Christiaan Berendsen. The Protein Journal 42, 168–176 (2023).
