= Interatomic potential =

Functions for calculating potential energy

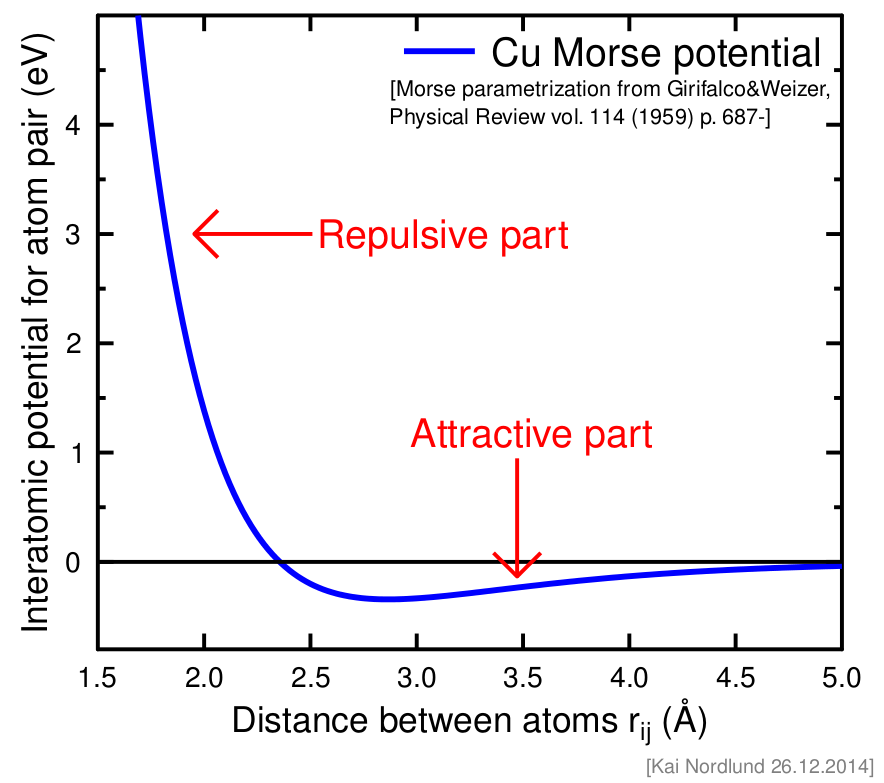
Typical shape of an interatomic pair potential.

Interatomic potentials are mathematical functions to calculate the potential energy of a system of atoms with given positions in space. Interatomic potentials are widely used as the physical basis of molecular mechanics and molecular dynamics simulations in computational chemistry, computational physics and computational materials science to explain and predict materials properties. Examples of quantitative properties and qualitative phenomena that are explored with interatomic potentials include lattice parameters, surface energies, interfacial energies, adsorption, cohesion, thermal expansion, and elastic and plastic material behavior, as well as chemical reactions.

== Functional form ==
Interatomic potentials can be written as a series expansion of functional terms that depend on the position of one, two, three, etc. atoms at a time. Then the total potential of the system $\textstyle V_\mathrm{}$ can be written as

$$V_\mathrm{} = \sum_{i = 1}^N V_1(\vec r_i) + \sum_{i,j = 1}^N V_2(\vec r_i,\vec r_j) + \sum_{i,j,k = 1}^N V_3(\vec r_i,\vec r_j,\vec r_k) + \cdots$$

Here $\textstyle V_1$ is the one-body term, $\textstyle V_2$ the two-body term, $\textstyle V_3$ the three body term, $\textstyle N$ the number of atoms in the system, $\vec r_i$ the position of atom $i$, etc. $i$, $j$ and $k$ are indices that loop over atom positions.

Note that in case the pair potential is given per atom pair, in the two-body term the potential should be multiplied by 1/2 as otherwise each bond is counted twice, and similarly the three-body term by 1/6. Alternatively, the summation of the pair term can be restricted to cases $\textstyle i<j$ and similarly for the three-body term $\textstyle i<j<k$, if the potential form is such that it is symmetric with respect to exchange of the $j$ and $k$ indices (this may not be the case for potentials for multielemental systems).

The one-body term is only meaningful if the atoms are in an external field (e.g. an electric field). In the absence of external fields, the potential $V$ should not depend on the absolute position of atoms, but only on the relative positions. This means that the functional form can be rewritten as a function of interatomic distances $\textstyle r_{ij} = |\vec r_i-\vec r_j|$ and angles between the bonds (vectors to neighbours) $\textstyle \theta_{ijk}$. Then, in the absence of external forces, the general form becomes

$$V_\mathrm{TOT} =  \sum_{i,j}^N V_2(r_{ij}) + \sum_{i,j,k}^N V_3(r_{ij},r_{ik},\theta_{ijk}) + \cdots$$

In the three-body term $\textstyle V_3$ the interatomic distance $\textstyle r_{jk}$ is not needed since the three terms $\textstyle r_{ij},r_{ik},\theta_{ijk}$ are sufficient to give the relative positions of three atoms $i, j, k$ in three-dimensional space. Any terms of order higher than 2 are also called many-body potentials. In some interatomic potentials the many-body interactions are embedded into the terms of a pair potential (see discussion on EAM-like and bond order potentials below).

In principle the sums in the expressions run over all $N$ atoms. However, if the range of the interatomic potential is finite, i.e. the potentials $\textstyle V(r) \equiv 0$ above some cutoff distance $\textstyle r_\mathrm{cut}$, the summing can be restricted to atoms within the cutoff distance of each other. By also using a cellular method for finding the neighbours, the MD algorithm can be an O(N) algorithm. Potentials with an infinite range can be summed up efficiently by Ewald summation and its further developments.

== Force calculation ==
The forces acting between atoms can be obtained by differentiation of the total energy with respect to atom positions. That is, to get the force on atom $i$ one should take the three-dimensional derivative (gradient) of the potential $V_\text{tot}$ with respect to the position of atom $i$:

$$\vec{F}_i = -\nabla_{\vec {r}_i} V_\mathrm{TOT}$$

For two-body potentials this gradient reduces, thanks to the symmetry with respect to $ij$ in the potential form, to straightforward differentiation with respect to the interatomic distances $\textstyle r_{ij}$. However, for many-body potentials (three-body, four-body, etc.) the differentiation becomes considerably more complex since the potential may not be any longer symmetric with respect to $ij$ exchange. In other words, also the energy of atoms $k$ that are not direct neighbours of $i$ can depend on the position $\textstyle \vec{r}_{i}$ because of angular and other many-body terms, and hence contribute to the gradient $\textstyle \nabla_{\vec{r}_{k}}$.

== Classes of interatomic potentials ==
Interatomic potentials come in many different varieties, with different physical motivations. Even for single well-known elements such as silicon, a wide variety of potentials quite different in functional form and motivation have been developed. The true interatomic interactions are quantum mechanical in nature, and there is no known way in which the true interactions described by the Schrödinger equation or Dirac equation for all electrons and nuclei could be cast into an analytical functional form. Hence all analytical interatomic potentials are by necessity approximations.

Over time interatomic potentials have largely grown more complex and more accurate, although this is not strictly true. This has included both increased descriptions of physics, as well as added parameters. Until recently, all interatomic potentials could be described as "parametric", having been developed and optimized with a fixed number of (physical) terms and parameters. New research focuses instead on non-parametric potentials which can be systematically improvable by using complex local atomic neighbor descriptors and separate mappings to predict system properties, such that the total number of terms and parameters are flexible. These non-parametric models can be significantly more accurate, but since they are not tied to physical forms and parameters, there are many potential issues surrounding extrapolation and uncertainties.

=== Parametric potentials ===
==== Pair potentials ====
The arguably simplest widely used interatomic interaction model is the Lennard-Jones potential

$$V_\mathrm{LJ}(r) = 4\varepsilon \left[ \left(\frac{\sigma}{r}\right)^{12} - \left(\frac{\sigma}{r}\right)^{6} \right]$$

where $\textstyle \varepsilon$ is the depth of the potential well and $\textstyle \sigma$ is the distance at which the potential crosses zero. The attractive term proportional to $\textstyle 1/r^6$ in the potential comes from the scaling of van der Waals forces, while the $\textstyle 1/r^{12}$ repulsive term is much more approximate (conveniently the square of the attractive term). On its own, this potential is quantitatively accurate only for noble gases and has been extensively studied in the past decades, but is also widely used for qualitative studies and in systems where dipole interactions are significant, particularly in chemistry force fields to describe intermolecular interactions - especially in fluids.

Another simple and widely used pair potential is the Morse potential, which consists simply of a sum of two exponentials.

$$V_\mathrm{M}(r) = D_e ( e^{-2a(r-r_e)}-2e^{-a(r-r_e)} )$$

Here $\textstyle D_e$ is the equilibrium bond energy and $\textstyle r_e$ the bond distance. The Morse potential has been applied to studies of molecular vibrations and solids, and also inspired the functional form of more accurate potentials such as the bond-order potentials.

Ionic materials are often described by a sum of a short-range repulsive term, such as the Buckingham pair potential, and a long-range Coulomb potential giving the ionic interactions between the ions forming the material. The short-range term for ionic materials can also be of many-body character.

Pair potentials have some inherent limitations, such as the inability to describe all 3 elastic constants of cubic metals or correctly describe both cohesive energy and vacancy formation energy. Therefore, quantitative molecular dynamics simulations are carried out with various of many-body potentials.

===== Repulsive potentials =====
For very short interatomic separations, important in radiation material science, the interactions can be described quite accurately with screened Coulomb potentials which have the general form

$$V(r_{ij}) = { 1 \over 4 \pi \varepsilon_0} {Z_1Z_2 e^2 \over r_{ij}} \varphi(r/a)$$

Here, $\varphi(r) \to 1$ when $r \to 0$. $Z_1$ and $Z_2$ are the charges of the interacting nuclei, and $a$ is the so-called screening parameter. A widely used popular screening function is the "Universal ZBL" one. and more accurate ones can be obtained from all-electron quantum chemistry calculations In a comparative study of several quantum chemistry methods, it was shown that pair-specific "NLH" repulsive potentials with a simple three-exponential screening function are accurate to within ~2% above 30 eV, while the universal ZBL potential differs by ~5%–10% from the quantum chemical calculations above 100 eV. In binary collision approximation simulations this kind of potential can be used to describe the nuclear stopping power.

==== Many-body potentials ====
The Stillinger-Weber potential is a potential that has a two-body and three-body terms of the standard form

$$V_\mathrm{TOT} =  \sum_{i,j}^N V_2(r_{ij}) + \sum_{i,j,k}^N V_3(r_{ij},r_{ik},\theta_{ijk})$$

where the three-body term describes how the potential energy changes with bond bending. It was originally developed for pure Si, but has been extended to many other elements and compounds and also formed the basis for other Si potentials.

Metals are very commonly described with what can be called "EAM-like" potentials, i.e. potentials that share the same functional form as the embedded atom model. In these potentials, the total potential energy is written

$$V_\mathrm{TOT} = \sum_i^N F_i \left(\sum_{j} \rho (r_{ij}) \right) + \frac{1}{2} \sum_{i, j}^N V_2(r_{ij})$$

where $\textstyle F_i$ is a so-called embedding function (not to be confused with the force $\textstyle \vec F_i$) that is a function of the sum of the so-called electron density $\textstyle \rho (r_{ij})$. $\textstyle V_2$ is a pair potential that usually is purely repulsive. In the original formulation the electron density function $\textstyle \rho (r_{ij})$ was obtained from true atomic electron densities, and the embedding function was motivated from density-functional theory as the energy needed to 'embed' an atom into the electron density. However, many other potentials used for metals share the same functional form but motivate the terms differently, e.g. based on tight-binding theory or other motivations.

EAM-like potentials are usually implemented as numerical tables. A collection of tables is available at the interatomic potential repository at NIST (see here).

Covalently bonded materials are often described by bond order potentials, sometimes also called Tersoff-like or Brenner-like potentials.

These have in general a form that resembles a pair potential:

$$V_{ij}(r_{ij}) = V_\mathrm{repulsive}(r_{ij}) + b_{ijk} V_\mathrm{attractive}(r_{ij})$$

where the repulsive and attractive part are simple exponential functions similar to those in the Morse potential. However, the strength is modified by the environment of the atom $i$ via the $b_{ijk}$ term. If implemented without an explicit angular dependence, these potentials can be shown to be mathematically equivalent to some varieties of EAM-like potentials. Thanks to this equivalence, the bond-order potential formalism has been implemented also for many metal-covalent mixed materials.

EAM potentialshave also been extended to describe covalent bonding by adding angular-dependent terms to the electron density function $\rho$, in what is called the modified embedded atom method (MEAM).

===== Force fields =====
A force field is the collection of parameters to describe the physical interactions between atoms or physical units (up to ~10^{8}) using a given energy expression. The term force field characterizes the collection of parameters for a given interatomic potential (energy function) and is often used within the computational chemistry community. The force field parameters make the difference between good and poor models. Force fields are used for the simulation of metals, ceramics, molecules, chemistry, and biological systems, covering the entire periodic table and multiphase materials. Today's performance is among the best for solid-state materials, molecular fluids, and for biomacromolecules, whereby biomacromolecules were the primary focus of force fields from the 1970s to the early 2000s. Force fields range from relatively simple and interpretable fixed-bond models (e.g. Interface force field, CHARMM, and COMPASS) to explicitly reactive models with many adjustable fit parameters (e.g. ReaxFF) and machine learning models.

=== Non-parametric potentials ===
It should first be noted that non-parametric potentials are often referred to as "machine learning" potentials. While the descriptor/mapping forms of non-parametric models are closely related to machine learning in general and their complex nature make machine learning fitting optimizations almost necessary, differentiation is important in that parametric models can also be optimized using machine learning.

Current research in interatomic potentials involves using systematically improvable, non-parametric mathematical forms and increasingly complex machine learning methods. The total energy is then written
$$V_\mathrm{TOT} = \sum_i^N E(\mathbf{q}_i)$$
where $\mathbf{q}_i$ is a mathematical representation of the atomic environment surrounding the atom $i$, known as the descriptor. $E$ is a machine-learning model that provides a prediction for the energy of atom $i$ based on the descriptor output. An accurate machine-learning potential requires both a robust descriptor and a suitable machine learning framework. The simplest descriptor is the set of interatomic distances from atom $i$ to its neighbours, yielding a machine-learned pair potential. However, more complex many-body descriptors are needed to produce highly accurate potentials. It is also possible to use a linear combination of multiple descriptors with associated machine-learning models. Potentials have been constructed using a variety of machine-learning methods, descriptors, and mappings, including neural networks, Gaussian process regression, and linear regression.

A non-parametric potential is most often trained to total energies, forces, and/or stresses obtained from quantum-level calculations, such as density functional theory, as with most modern potentials. However, the accuracy of a machine-learning potential can be converged to be comparable with the underlying quantum calculations, unlike analytical models. Hence, they are in general more accurate than traditional analytical potentials, but they are correspondingly less able to extrapolate. Further, owing to the complexity of the machine-learning model and the descriptors, they are computationally far more expensive than their analytical counterparts.

Non-parametric, machine learned potentials may also be combined with parametric, analytical potentials, for example to include known physics such as the screened Coulomb repulsion, or to impose physical constraints on the predictions.

== Potential fitting ==
Since the interatomic potentials are approximations, they by necessity all involve parameters that need to be adjusted to some reference values. In simple potentials such as the Lennard-Jones and Morse ones, the parameters are interpretable and can be set to match e.g. the equilibrium bond length and bond strength of a dimer molecule or the surface energy of a solid . Lennard-Jones potential can typically describe the lattice parameters, surface energies, and approximate mechanical properties. Many-body potentials often contain tens or even hundreds of adjustable parameters with limited interpretability and no compatibility with common interatomic potentials for bonded molecules. Such parameter sets can be fit to a larger set of experimental data, or materials properties derived from less reliable data such as from density-functional theory. For solids, a many-body potential can often describe the lattice constant of the equilibrium crystal structure, the cohesive energy, and linear elastic constants, as well as basic point defect properties of all the elements and stable compounds well, although deviations in surface energies often exceed 50%. Non-parametric potentials in turn contain hundreds or even thousands of independent parameters to fit. For any but the simplest model forms, sophisticated optimization and machine learning methods are necessary for useful potentials.

The aim of most potential functions and fitting is to make the potential transferable, i.e. that it can describe materials properties that are clearly different from those it was fitted to (for examples of potentials explicitly aiming for this, see e.g.). Key aspects here are the correct representation of chemical bonding, validation of structures and energies, as well as interpretability of all parameters. Full transferability and interpretability is reached with the Interface force field (IFF). An example of partial transferability, a review of interatomic potentials of Si describes that Stillinger-Weber and Tersoff III potentials for Si can describe several (but not all) materials properties they were not fitted to.

The NIST interatomic potential repository provides a collection of fitted interatomic potentials, either as fitted parameter values or numerical tables of the potential functions. The OpenKIM project also provides a repository of fitted potentials, along with collections of validation tests and a software framework for promoting reproducibility in molecular simulations using interatomic potentials.

== Machine-learned interatomic potentials ==
Since the 1990s, machine learning programs have been employed to construct interatomic potentials, mapping atomic structures to their potential energies. These are generally referred to as 'machine learning potentials' (MLPs) or as 'machine-learned interatomic potentials' (MLIPs). Such machine learning potentials help fill the gap between highly accurate but computationally intensive simulations like density functional theory and computationally lighter, but much less precise, empirical potentials. Early neural networks showed promise, but their inability to systematically account for interatomic energy interactions limited their applications to smaller, low-dimensional systems, keeping them largely within the confines of academia. However, with continuous advancements in artificial intelligence technology, machine learning methods have become significantly more accurate, increasing the use of machine learning in the field.

Modern neural networks have revolutionized the construction of highly accurate and computationally light potentials by integrating theoretical understanding of materials science into their architectures and preprocessing. Almost all are local, accounting for all interactions between an atom and its neighbor up to some cutoff radius. These neural networks usually intake atomic coordinates and output potential energies. Atomic coordinates are sometimes transformed with atom-centered symmetry functions or pair symmetry functions before being fed into neural networks. Encoding symmetry has been pivotal in enhancing machine learning potentials by drastically constraining the neural networks' search space.

Conversely, message-passing neural networks (MPNNs), a form of graph neural networks, learn their own descriptors and symmetry encodings. They treat molecules as three-dimensional graphs and iteratively update each atom's feature vectors as information about neighboring atoms is processed through message functions and convolutions. These feature vectors are then used to directly predict the final potentials. In 2017, the first-ever MPNN model, a deep tensor neural network, was used to calculate the properties of small organic molecules.

Another class of machine-learned interatomic potential is the Gaussian approximation potential (GAP), which combines compact descriptors of local atomic environments with Gaussian process regression to machine learn the potential energy surface of a given system. To date, the GAP framework has been used to successfully develop a number of MLIPs for various systems, including for elemental systems such as Carbon Silicon, and Tungsten, as well as for multicomponent systems such as Ge_{2}Sb_{2}Te_{5} and austenitic stainless steel, Fe_{7}Cr_{2}Ni.

== Reliability of interatomic potentials ==
Classical interatomic potentials often exceed the accuracy of simplified quantum mechanical methods such as density functional theory at a million times lower computational cost. The use of interatomic potentials is recommended for the simulation of nanomaterials, biomacromolecules, and electrolytes from atoms up to millions of atoms at the 100 nm scale and beyond. As a limitation, electron densities and quantum processes at the local scale of hundreds of atoms are not included. When of interest, higher level quantum chemistry methods can be locally used.

The robustness of a model at different conditions other than those used in the fitting process is often measured in terms of transferability of the potential.
