= Drude particle =

Drude particles are model oscillators used to simulate the effects of electronic polarizability in the context of a classical molecular mechanics force field. They are inspired by the Drude model of mobile electrons and are used in the computational study of proteins, nucleic acids, and other biomolecules.

== Classical Drude oscillator ==
Most force fields in current practice represent individual atoms as point particles interacting according to the laws of Newtonian mechanics. To each atom, a single electric charge is assigned that doesn't change during the course of the simulation. However, such models cannot have induced dipoles or other electronic effects due to a changing local environment.

Classical Drude particles are massless virtual sites carrying a partial electric charge, attached to individual atoms via a harmonic spring. The spring constant and relative partial charges on the atom and associated Drude particle determine its response to the local electrostatic field, serving as a proxy for the changing distribution of the electronic charge of the atom or molecule. However, this response is limited to a changing dipole moment. This response is not enough to model interactions in environments with large field gradients, which interact with higher order moments.

=== Efficiency of simulation ===
The major computational cost of simulating classical Drude oscillators is the calculation of the local electrostatic field and the repositioning of the Drude particle at each step. Traditionally, this repositioning is done self consistently. This cost can be reduced by assigning a small mass to each Drude particle, applying a Lagrangian transformation and evolving the simulation in the generalised coordinates. This method of simulation has been used to create water models incorporating classical Drude oscillators.

== Quantum Drude oscillator ==
Since the response of a classical Drude oscillator is limited, it is not enough to model interactions in heterogeneous media with large field gradients, where higher order electronic responses have significant contributions to the interaction energy. A quantum Drude oscillator (QDO) is a natural extension to the classical Drude oscillator. Instead of a classical point particle serving as a proxy for the charge distribution, a QDO uses a quantum harmonic oscillator, in the form of a pseudo-electron connected to an oppositely charged pseudo-nucleus by a harmonic spring.

A QDO has three free parameters: the spring's frequency $\omega$, the pseudo-electron's charge $q$ and the system's reduced mass $\mu$. The ground state of a QDO is a gaussian of width $\sigma = 1/\sqrt{2 \mu \omega}$. Adding an external field perturbs the ground state of a QDO, which allows us to calculate its polarizability. To second order, the change in energy relative to the ground state is given by the following series:

$$E^{(2)} = \sum_{l=1}^{\infty} E_l^{(2)} = \sum_{l=1}^{\infty} - \frac{Q^2 \alpha_l}{2 R^{2l + 2}}$$

where the polarizabilities $\alpha_l$ are

$$\alpha_l = \left[ \frac{q^2}{\mu \omega^2} \right] \left[ \frac{(2 l - 1)!!}{l} \right] \left( \frac{\hbar}{2 \mu \omega} \right)^{l-1}$$

Furthermore, since QDOs are quantum mechanical objects, their electrons can correlate, giving rise to dispersion forces between them. The second order change in energy corresponding to such an interaction is:

$$E^{(2)} = \sum_{l=3}^{\infty} C_{2 l} R^{-2 l}$$

with the first three dispersion coefficients being (in the case of identical QDOs):

$$C_6 = \frac{3}{4} \alpha_1 \alpha_1 \hbar \omega$$
$$C_8 = 5 \alpha_1 \alpha_2 \hbar \omega$$
$$C_{10} = \left( \frac{21}{2} \alpha_1 \alpha_3 + \frac{70}{4} \alpha_2 \alpha_2 \right) \hbar \omega$$

Since the response coefficients of QDOs depend on three parameters only, they are all related. Thus, these response coefficients can combine into four dimensionless constants, all equal to unity:

$$\sqrt{\frac{20}{9}} \frac{\alpha_2}{\sqrt{\alpha_1 \alpha_3}} = 1$$
$$\sqrt{\frac{49}{40}} \frac{C_8}{\sqrt{C_6 C_{10}}} = 1$$
$$\frac{C_6 \alpha_1}{4 C_9} = 1$$

The QDO representation of atoms is the basis of the many body dispersion model which is a popular way to account for electrostatic forces in molecular dynamics simulations. This representation allows describing the processes of biological ion transport, small drug molecules across hydrophobic cell membranes and the behavior of proteins in solutions.
