= William Hoover =

William Hoover may refer to:

- Buster Hoover (William James Hoover), American outfielder in Major League Baseball
- William G. Hoover, American computational physicist
- William Henry Hoover, founder of the Hoover Company
