= Anton (computer) =

Supercomputer designed and built by D. E. Shaw Research

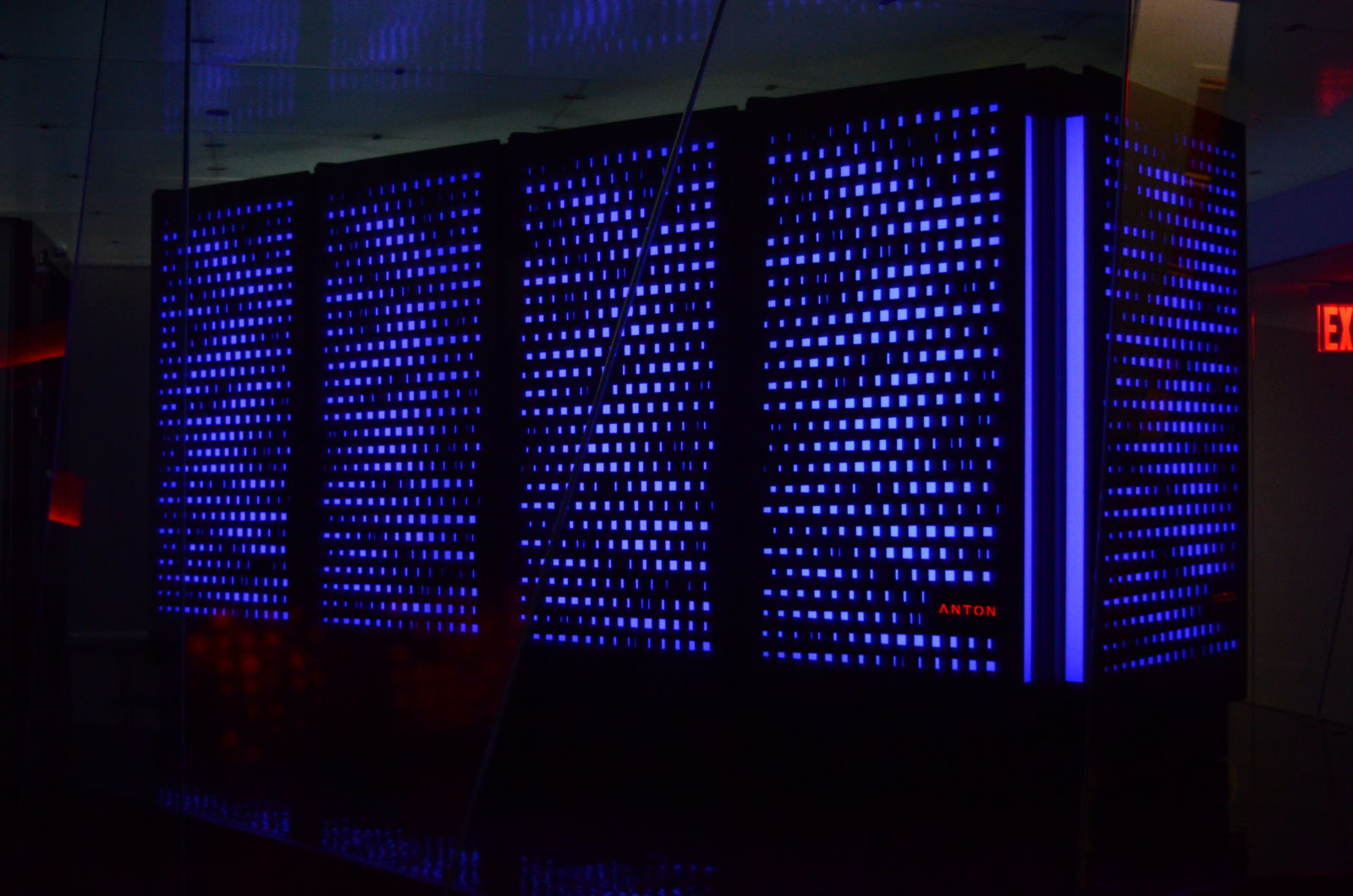

Anton is a massively parallel supercomputer designed and built by D. E. Shaw Research in New York, first running in 2008. It is a special-purpose system for molecular dynamics (MD) simulations of proteins and other biological macromolecules. An Anton machine consists of a substantial number of application-specific integrated circuits (ASICs), interconnected by a specialized high-speed, three-dimensional torus network.

Unlike earlier special-purpose systems for MD simulations, such as MDGRAPE-3 developed by RIKEN in Japan, Anton runs its computations entirely on specialized ASICs, instead of dividing the computation between specialized ASICs and general-purpose host processors.

Each Anton ASIC contains two computational subsystems. Most of the calculation of electrostatic and van der Waals forces is performed by the high-throughput interaction subsystem (HTIS). This subsystem contains 32 deeply pipelined modules running at 800 MHz arranged much like a systolic array. The remaining calculations, including the bond forces and the fast Fourier transforms (used for long-range electrostatics), are performed by the flexible subsystem. This subsystem contains four general-purpose Tensilica cores (each with cache and scratchpad memory) and eight specialized but programmable SIMD cores called geometry cores. The flexible subsystem runs at 400 MHz.

Anton's network is a 3D torus and thus each chip has 6 inter-node links with a total in+out bandwidth of 607.2 Gbit/s. An inter-node link is composed of two equal one-way links (one traveling in each direction), with each one-way link having 50.6 Gbit/s of bandwidth. Each one-way link is composed of 11 lanes, where a lane is a differential pair of wires signaling at 4.6 Gbit/s. The per-hop latency in Anton's network is 50 ns. Each ASIC is also attached to its own DRAM bank, enabling large simulations.

The performance of a 512-node Anton machine is over 17,000 nanoseconds of simulated time per day for a protein-water system consisting of 23,558 atoms. In comparison, MD codes running on general-purpose parallel computers with hundreds or thousands of processor cores achieve simulation rates of up to a few hundred nanoseconds per day on the same chemical system. The first 512-node Anton machine became operational in October 2008. The multiple petaFLOP, distributed-computing project Folding@home has achieved similar aggregate ensemble simulation timescales, comparable to the total time of a single continuous simulation on Anton, specifically achieving the 1.5-millisecond range in January 2010.

The Anton supercomputer is named after Anton van Leeuwenhoek, who is often referred to as "the father of microscopy" because he built high-precision optical instruments and used them to visualize a wide variety of organisms and cell types for the first time.

The ANTON 2 machine with four 512 nodes and its substantially increased speed and problem size has been described.

The National Institutes of Health have supported an ANTON for the biomedical research community at the Pittsburgh Supercomputing Center, Carnegie Mellon University, and currently (8/20) continues with an ANTON 2 system.

== See also ==
- MIPS architecture
- FLOPS
