= Berendsen (surname) =

Berendsen is a Dutch patronymic surname. It is most common in southeast Gelderland. The given name Berend, like Barend, is a form of the name Bernhard.

- Carl Berendsen (1890–1973), New Zealand civil servant and diplomat
- Dan Berendsen (born 1964), American producer and screenwriter
- Fritz Berendsen (1904–1974), German politician
- Herman Berendsen (1934–2019), Dutch chemist after whom the Berendsen thermostat was named
- Sophus Berendsen (1829–1884), Danish businessman
- Til Gardeniers-Berendsen (1925–2019), Dutch government minister
