= Andersen thermostat =

Algorithm in molecular physics

The Andersen thermostat is a proposal in molecular dynamics simulation for maintaining constant temperature conditions. It is based on periodic reassignment of the velocities of atoms or molecules. For each atom or molecule, the reassigned velocity is picked randomly according to Maxwell–Boltzmann statistics for the given temperature. The thermostat is named after chemist Hans C. Andersen from his 1980 work on the topic.

== Introduction ==
When a system exists at some temperature, the energy of particles' degrees of freedom are randomly distributed according to a Boltzmann distribution. The energy of such systems is not constant; it's constantly fluctuating due to exchange of energy with surroundings. The Andersen thermostat models this exchange of energy with the surroundings as random perturbations on randomly selected particles. This is in contrast to methods such as the Nosé–Hoover thermostat.

== Description ==
At each time step of the molecular dynamics simulation, a number of particles are selected to undergo "thermalization". The probability of any given particle being picked in this manner is $\nu \Delta t$ for a (small) time step of length $\Delta t$ and coupling strength $\nu$, which is a parameter of the simulation. If a particle is picked at some time step, its velocity is changed to a velocity randomly picked from the Boltzmann distribution of velocities. Due to this interaction with a bath, the system conserves neither energy nor momentum. In addition, the velocity autocorrelation function decays more quickly than it would in a real system, due to the random decorrelation of the particles. This effect grows with increasing collision frequency $\nu$.

== See also ==
- Berendsen thermostat
