= Flying ice cube =

Artifact in molecular dynamics simulations

In molecular dynamics (MD) simulations, the flying ice cube effect is an artifact in which the energy of high-frequency fundamental modes is drained into low-frequency modes, particularly into zero-frequency motions such as overall translation and rotation of the system. The artifact derives its name from a particularly noticeable manifestation that arises in simulations of particles in vacuum, where the system being simulated acquires high linear momentum and experiences extremely damped internal motions, freezing the system into a single conformation reminiscent of an ice cube or other rigid body flying through space. The artifact is entirely a consequence of molecular dynamics algorithms and is wholly unphysical, since it violates the principle of equipartition of energy.

== Origin and avoidance ==
The flying ice cube artifact arises from repeated rescalings of the velocities of the particles in the simulation system. Velocity rescaling is a means of imposing a thermostat on the system by multiplying the velocities of a system's particles by a factor after an integration timestep is completed, as is done by the Berendsen thermostat and the Bussi–Donadio–Parrinello thermostat. These schemes fail when the rescaling is done to a kinetic energy distribution of an ensemble that is not invariant under microcanonical molecular dynamics; thus, the Berendsen thermostat (which rescales to the isokinetic ensemble) exhibits the artifact, while the Bussi–Donadio–Parrinello thermostat (which rescales to the canonical ensemble) does not exhibit the artifact. Rescaling to an ensemble that is not invariant under microcanonical molecular dynamics results in a violation of the balance condition that is a requirement of Monte Carlo simulations (molecular dynamics simulations with velocity rescaling thermostats can be thought of as Monte Carlo simulations with molecular dynamics moves and velocity rescaling moves), which is the artifact's underlying reason.

When the flying ice cube problem was first found, the Bussi–Donadio–Parrinello thermostat had not yet been developed, and it was desired to continue using the Berendsen thermostat due to the efficiency with which velocity rescaling thermostats relax systems to desired temperatures. Thus, suggestions were given to avoid the flying ice cube effect under the Berendsen thermostat, such as periodically removing the center-of-mass motions and using a longer temperature coupling time. However, more recently it has been recommended that the better practice is to discontinue use of the Berendsen thermostat entirely in favor of the Bussi–Donadio–Parrinello thermostat, as it has been shown that the latter thermostat does not exhibit the flying ice cube effect.
