= D. E. Shaw Research =

American biochemistry research company

- Type: Private
- Headquarters: New York City, United States
- Key people: David E. Shaw
- Products: Desmond; Anton
- Website: www.deshawresearch.com

D. E. Shaw Research (DESRES) is a privately held biochemistry research company based in New York City. Under the scientific direction of David E. Shaw, the group's chief scientist, D. E. Shaw Research develops technologies for molecular dynamics simulations (including Anton, a massively parallel special-purpose supercomputer, and Desmond, a software package for use on conventional computers and computer clusters) and applies such simulations to basic scientific research in structural biology and biochemistry, and to the process of computer-aided drug design.

This interdisciplinary laboratory is composed of members with backgrounds in chemistry, biology, hardware engineering and design, computer science, or applied mathematics. In addition to its main New York facility, D. E. Shaw Research has offices in Durham, North Carolina and Hyderabad, India.
