= ReaxFF =

Computational model of molecular forces

ReaxFF (for "reactive force field") is a bond order-based force field developed by Adri van Duin, William A. Goddard, III, and co-workers at the California Institute of Technology. One of its applications is molecular dynamics simulations. Whereas traditional force fields are unable to model chemical reactions because of the requirement of breaking and forming bonds (a force field's functional form depends on having all bonds defined explicitly), ReaxFF eschews explicit bonds in favor of bond orders, which allows for continuous bond formation/breaking. ReaxFF aims to be as general as possible and has been parameterized and tested for hydrocarbon reactions, alkoxysilane gelation, transition-metal-catalyzed nanotube formation, and many advanced material applications such as Li ion batteries, TiO_{2}, polymers, and high-energy materials.

To be able to deal with bond breaking and formation whilst having only 1 single atom type for each element, ReaxFF is a fairly complex force field with many parameters. Therefore an extensive training set is necessary covering the relevant chemical phase space, including bond and angle stretches, activation and reaction energies, equation of state, surface energies, and much more. Usually, but not necessarily, the training data is generated with electronic structure methods. In practice, often DFT calculations are used as a pragmatic approach, especially since more accurate functionals are available. For the parameterization of such a complex force field, global optimization techniques offer the best chance to get a parameter set that most closely describes the training data.
