= Internal Coordinate Mechanics =

Technique in computational chemistry

Internal Coordinate Mechanics (ICM) is a software program and algorithm to predict low-energy conformations of molecules by sampling the space of internal coordinates (bond lengths, bond angles and dihedral angles) defining molecular geometry. In ICM each molecule is constructed as a tree from an entry atom where each next atom is built iteratively from the preceding three atoms via three internal variables. The rings kept rigid or imposed via additional restraints. ICM is used for modelling peptides and interactions with substrates and coenzymes.

== Software ==
ICM also is a programming environment for various tasks in computational chemistry and computational structural biology, sequence analysis and rational drug design. The original goal was to develop algorithms for energy optimization of several biopolymers with respect to an arbitrary subset of internal coordinates such as bond lengths, bond angles torsion angles and phase angles. The efficient and general global optimization method which evolved from the original ICM method is still the central piece of the program. It is this basic algorithm which is used for peptide prediction, homology modeling and loop simulations, flexible macromolecular docking and energy refinement. However the complexity of problems related to structure prediction and analysis, as well as the desire for perfection, compactness and consistency, led to the program's expansion into neighboring areas such as graphics, chemistry, sequence analysis and database searches, mathematics, statistics and plotting.

The original meaning became too narrow, but the name was kept. The current integrated ICM shell contains hundreds of variables, functions, commands, database and web tools, novel algorithms for structure prediction and analysis into a powerful, yet compact program which is still called ICM. The seven principal areas are centered on a general core of shell-language and data analysis and visualization.
