= William G. Hoover =

American computational physicist

William Graham Hoover is an American computational physicist.

He is best known for creating the Nose–Hoover method in molecular dynamics.

== Selected publications ==
- Hoover, William G. (Mar 1985). "Canonical dynamics: Equilibrium phase-space distributions". Phys. Rev. A. 31 (3). American Physical Society: 1695–1697. Bibcode:1985PhRvA..31.1695H. doi:10.1103/PhysRevA.31.1695.
