= 1944 =

1944 in various calendars
- Gregorian calendar: 1944; MCMXLIV
- Ab urbe condita: 2697
- Armenian calendar: 1393; ԹՎ ՌՅՂԳ
- Assyrian calendar: 6694
- Baháʼí calendar: 100–101
- Balinese saka calendar: 1865–1866
- Bengali calendar: 1350–1351
- Berber calendar: 2894
- British Regnal year: 8 Geo. 6 – 9 Geo. 6
- Buddhist calendar: 2488
- Burmese calendar: 1306
- Byzantine calendar: 7452–7453
- Chinese calendar: 癸未年 (Water Goat); 4641 or 4434 — to — 甲申年 (Wood Monkey); 4642 or 4435
- Coptic calendar: 1660–1661
- Discordian calendar: 3110
- Ethiopian calendar: 1936–1937
- Hebrew calendar: 5704–5705
- Hindu calendars
- Vikram Samvat: 2000–2001
- Shaka Samvat: 1865–1866
- Kali Yuga: 5044–5045
- Holocene calendar: 11944
- Igbo calendar: 944–945
- Iranian calendar: 1322–1323
- Islamic calendar: 1363–1364
- Japanese calendar: Shōwa 19 (昭和１９年)
- Javanese calendar: 1874–1875
- Juche calendar: 33
- Julian calendar: Gregorian minus 13 days
- Korean calendar: 4277
- Minguo calendar: ROC 33 民國33年
- Nanakshahi calendar: 476
- Thai solar calendar: 2487
- Tibetan calendar: ཆུ་མོ་ལུག་ལོ་ (female Water-Sheep); 2070 or 1689 or 917 — to — ཤིང་ཕོ་སྤྲེ་ལོ་ (male Wood-Monkey); 2071 or 1690 or 918

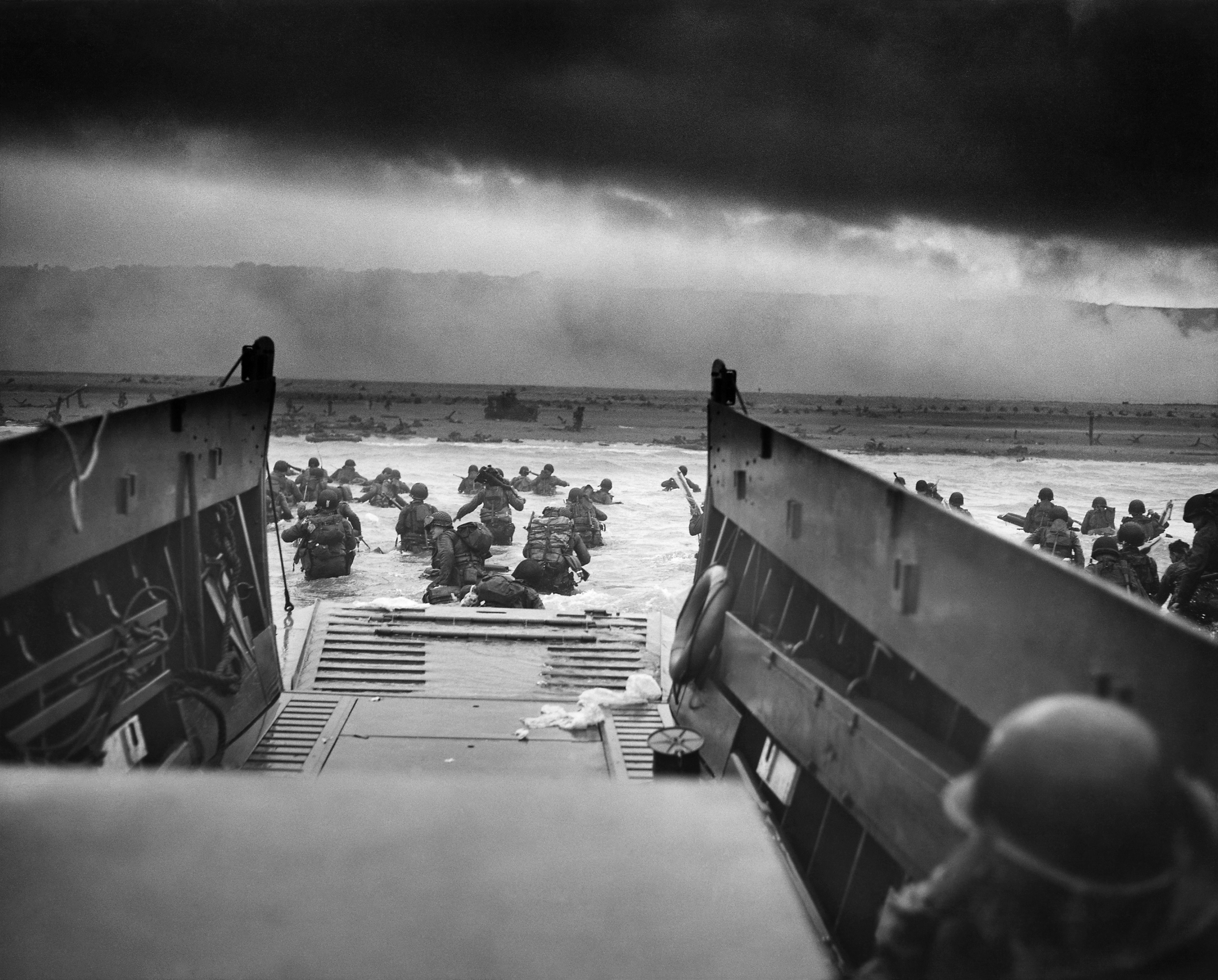
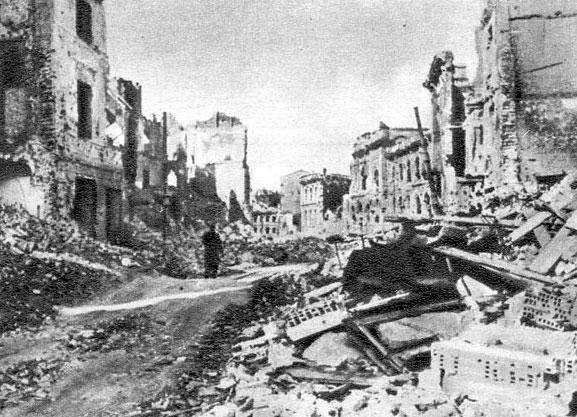
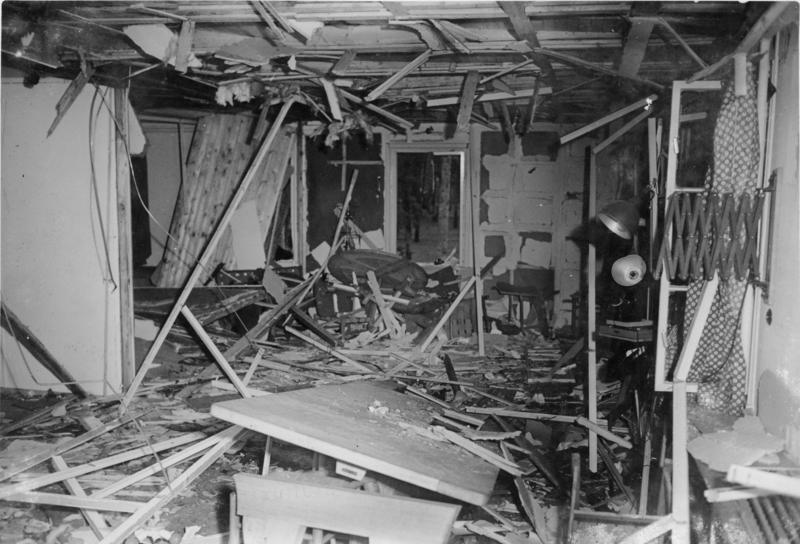
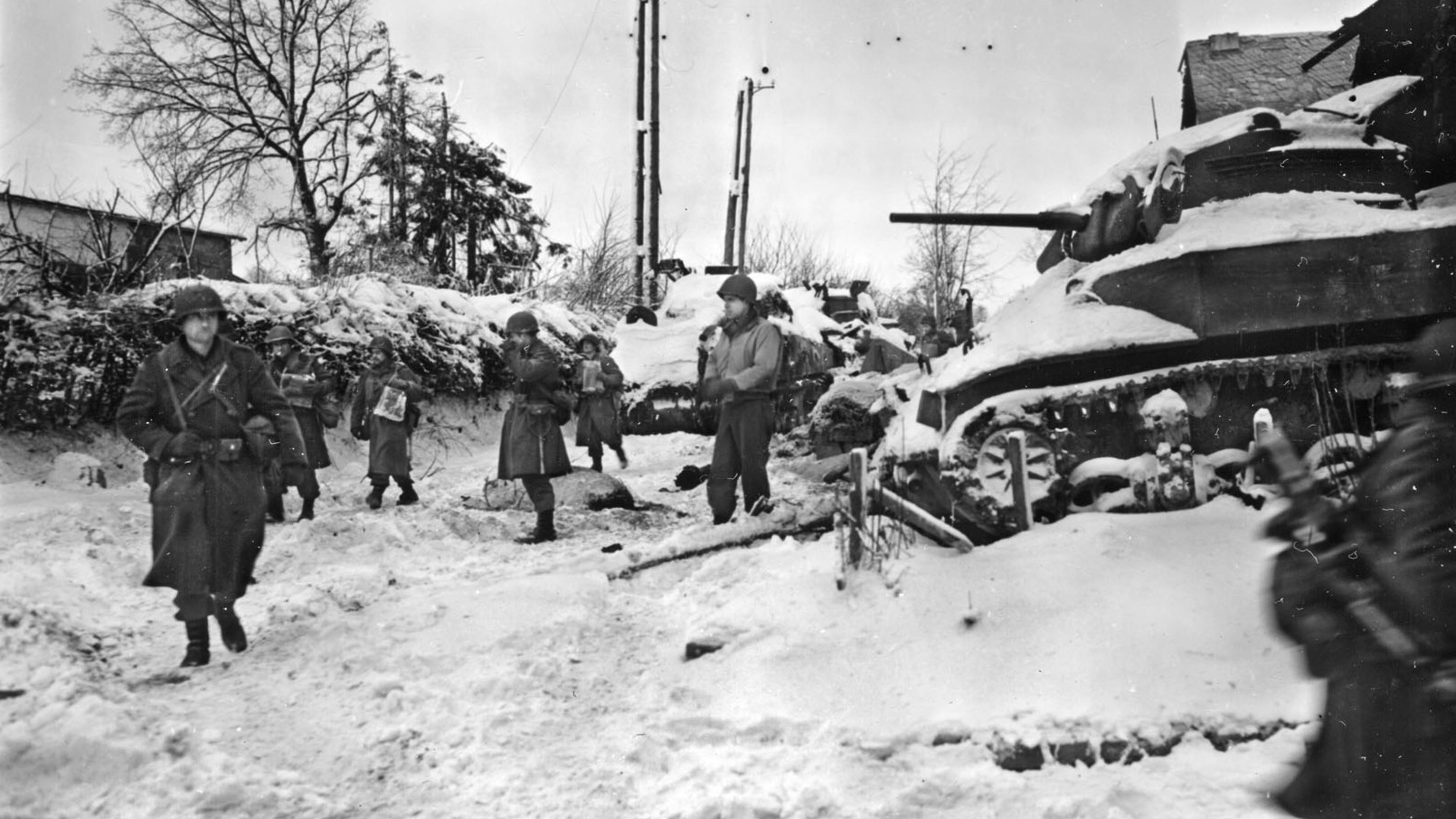
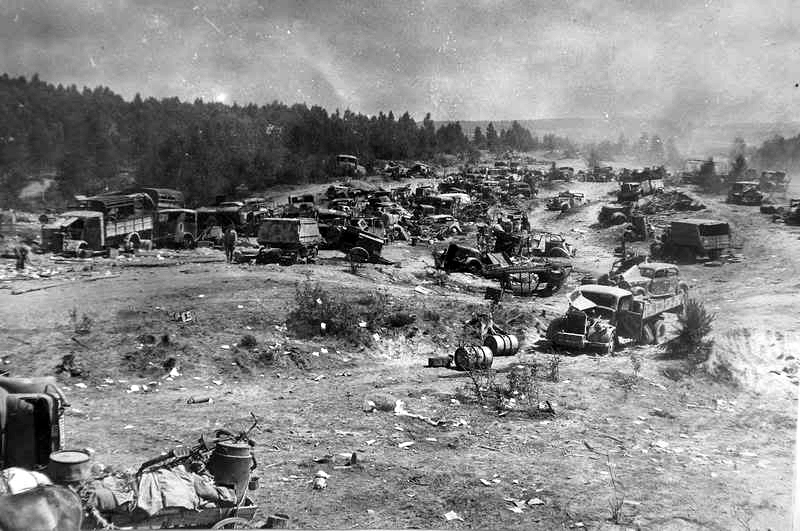
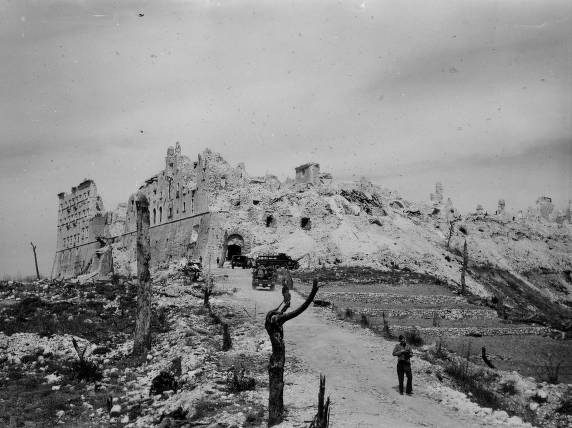
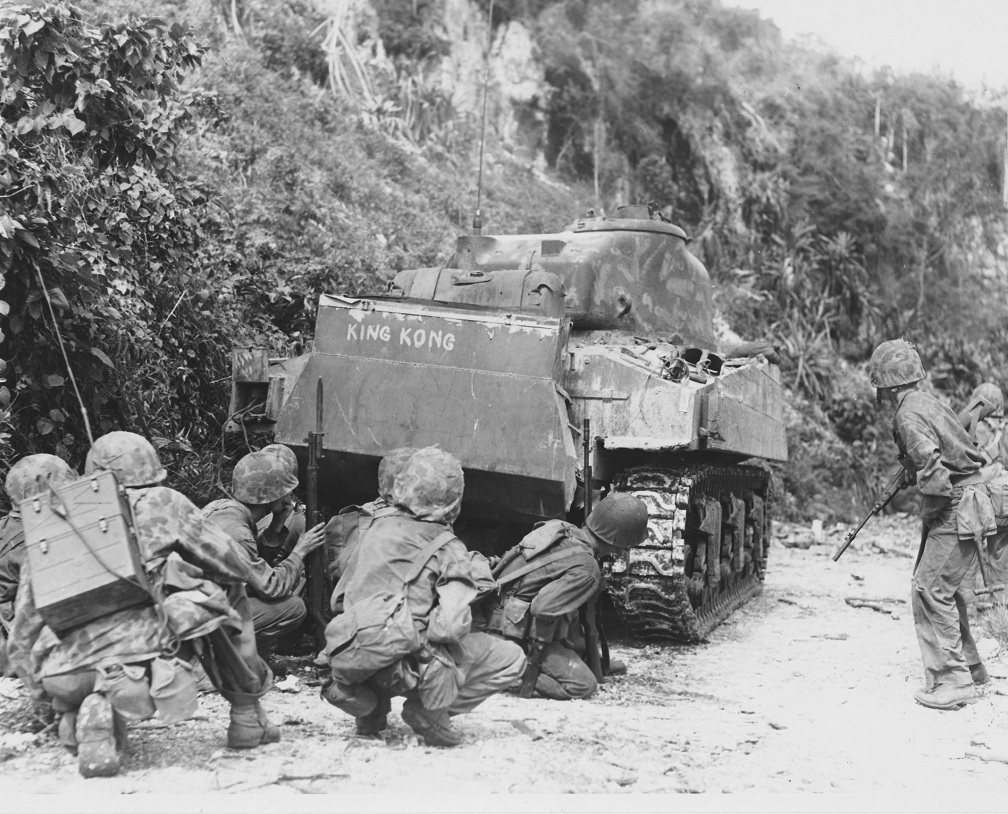
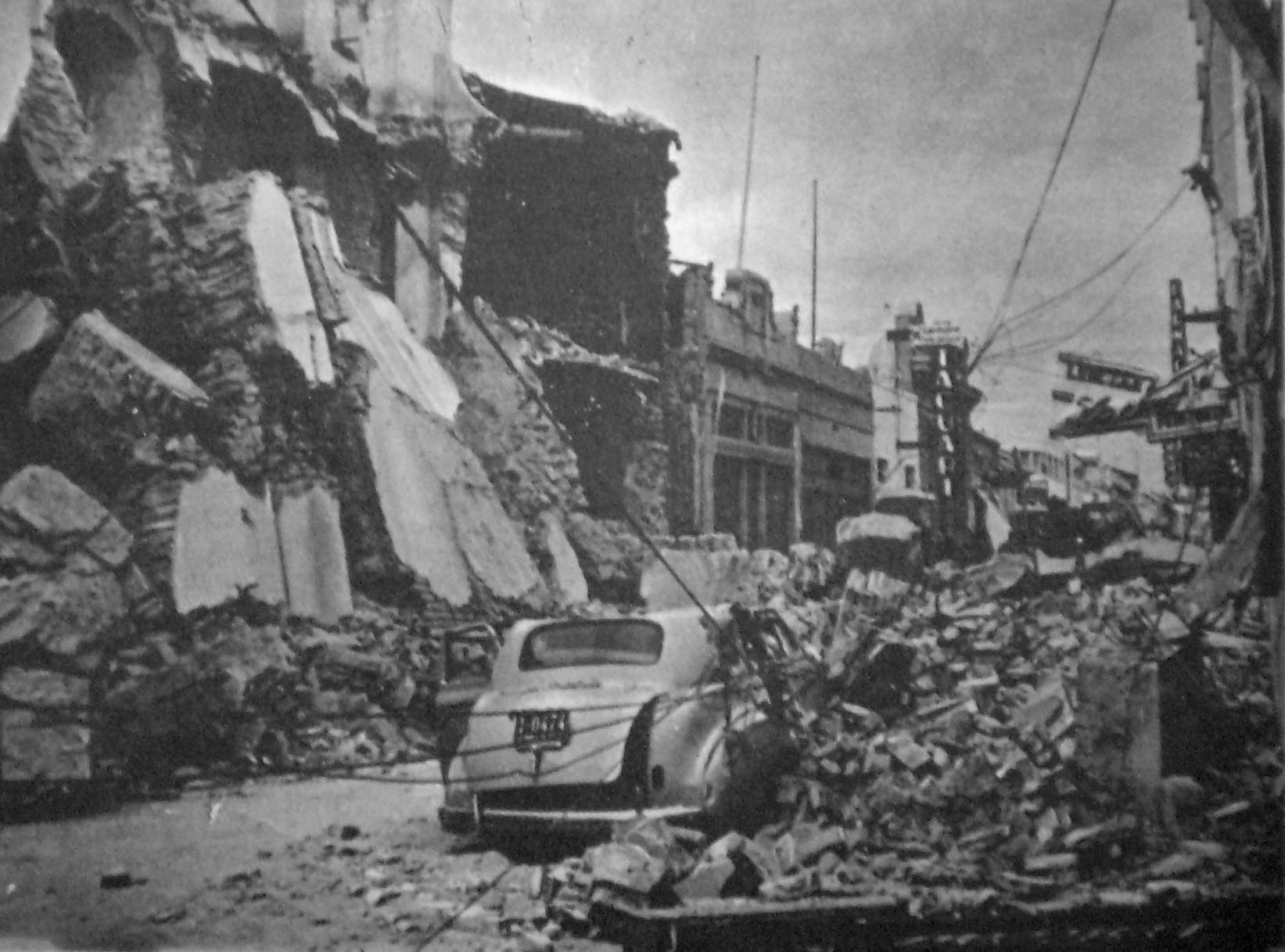
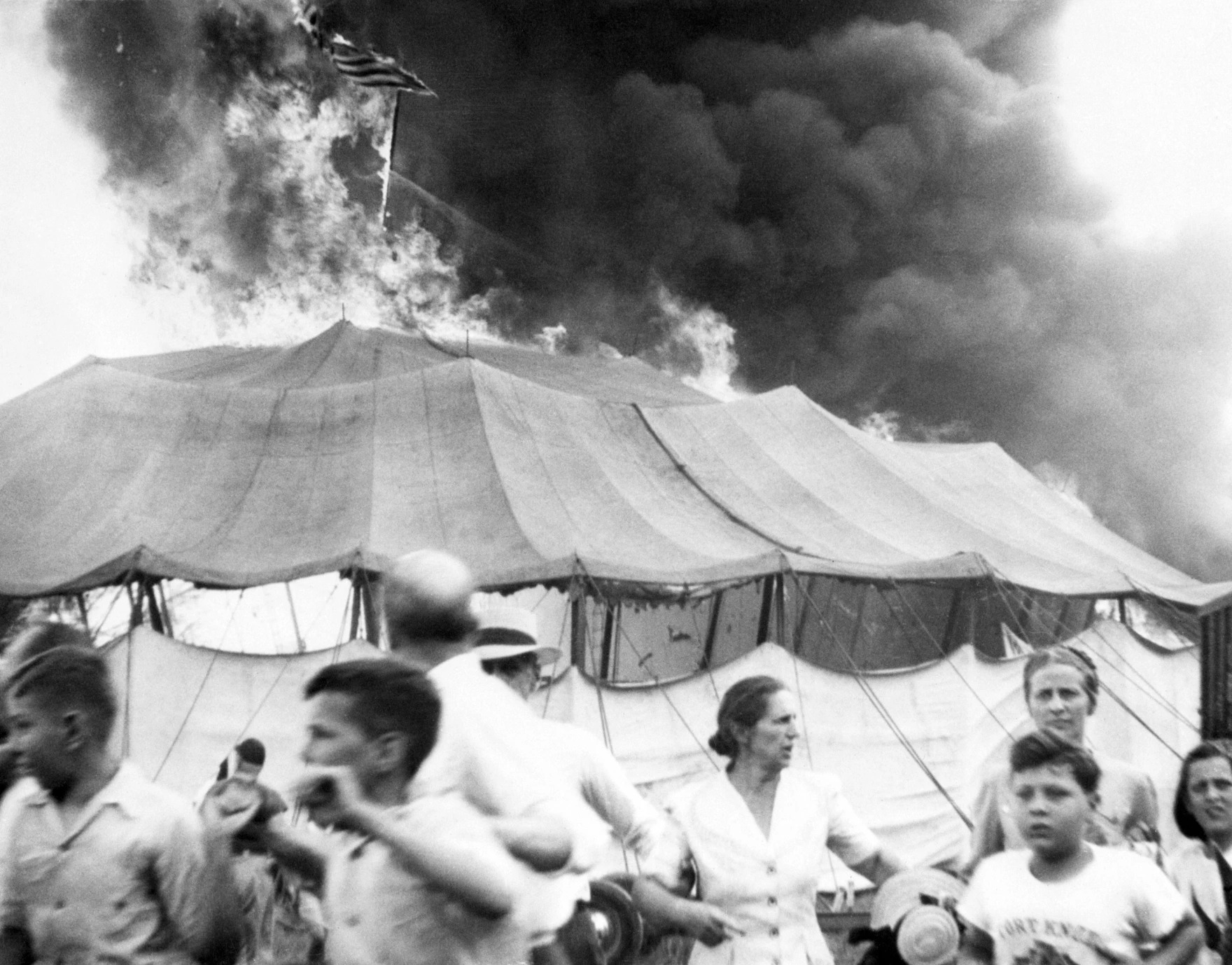
From top to bottom, left to right:
- The Allied invasion of Normandy on D-Day launches the largest amphibious assault in history, turning the Western Front;
- The Warsaw Uprising sees Polish fighters rise against Nazi occupation but are crushed with massive civilian losses;
- The 20 July plot fails as officers including Claus von Stauffenberg attempt to kill Adolf Hitler;
- The Battle of the Bulge is Nazi Germany’s final Western offensive, ultimately failing;
- Operation Bagration destroys Germany’s Army Group Centre and liberates Belarus;
- The Battle of Monte Cassino sees Allied forces breach the Gustav Line after months of fighting;
- The Battle of Saipan gives the United States a strategic Pacific foothold near the Japanese homeland;
- The 1944 San Juan earthquake devastates Argentina’s San Juan Province;
- Hartford circus fire kills nearly 170 in Connecticut, one of the deadliest U.S. fire disasters.

1944 (MCMXLIV) was a leap year starting on Saturday of the Gregorian calendar, the 1944th year of the Common Era (CE) and Anno Domini (AD) designations, the 944th year of the 2nd millennium, the 44th year of the 20th century, and the 5th year of the 1940s decade.

This is the last year that the ecclesiastical full moon to be on Saturday 8 April until the year 3679.

== Events ==
Below, the events of World War II have the "WWII" prefix.

=== January ===
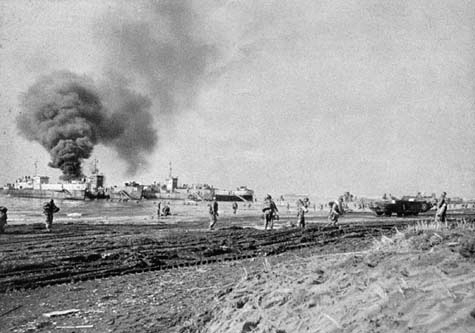
US Army troops landing at Anzio during Operation Shingle, late January 1944.

- January 2 – WWII:
  - Free French General Jean de Lattre de Tassigny is appointed to command French Army B, part of the Sixth United States Army Group in North Africa.
  - Landing at Saidor: 13,000 US and Australian troops land on Papua New Guinea in an attempt to cut off a Japanese retreat.
- January 8 – WWII: Philippine Commonwealth troops enter the province of Ilocos Sur in northern Luzon and attack Japanese forces.
- January 11
  - United States President Franklin D. Roosevelt proposes a Second Bill of Rights for social and economic security, in his State of the Union address.
  - The Nazi German administration expands Kraków-Płaszów concentration camp into the larger standalone Konzentrationslager Plaszow bei Krakau in occupied Poland.
- January 12 – WWII: Winston Churchill and Charles de Gaulle begin a 2-day conference in Marrakesh.
- January 14 – WWII: Soviet troops start the offensive at Leningrad and Novgorod.
- January 15
  - WWII: The 27th Polish Home Army Infantry Division is re-created, marking the start of Operation Tempest by the Polish Home Army, a resistance force.
  - 1944 San Juan earthquake: An earthquake hits San Juan, Argentina, killing an estimated 10,000 people, in the worst natural disaster in Argentina's history.
  - The Battle of Monte Cassino begins in Italy. British forces cross the Garigliano River. U.S. Fifth Army troops, commanded by Lieutenant-General Mark W. Clark, arrive at the Garigliano, to begin their attack against the Gustav Line south of Rome. The French Expeditionary Corps, under command of General Alphonse Juin, moves into the mountains north of Monte Cassino.
  - The Soviet Union ceases production of the Mosin–Nagant 1891/30 sniper rifle.
- January 17 – WWII: The Battle of Korsun–Cherkassy begins in the Soviet Ukraine.
- January 20 – WWII:
  - The Royal Air Force drops 2,300 tons of bombs on Berlin.
  - The United States 36th Infantry Division in Italy attempts to cross the Rapido River.
- January 22 – WWII: Operation Shingle: The Allies begin the assault on Anzio, Italy. The U.S. 45th Infantry Division stand their ground at Anzio against violent assaults for four months.
- January 25 – A total solar eclipse is visible in Pacific Ocean, South America, Atlantic Ocean and Africa, the 48th solar eclipse of Solar Saros 130.
- January 26 – WWII: Argentina gave in to the Allies' pressure, severing diplomatic relations with the Axis.
- January 27 – WWII:
  - The two-year Siege of Leningrad is lifted.
  - Light cruiser HMS Spartan is sunk by a Henschel Hs 293 guided missile from a German aircraft off Anzio, western Italy, with the loss of 46 men.
- January 29 – WWII: Koniuchy massacre – A unit of Soviet partisans accompanied by Jewish partisans kills at least 38 civilians in the village of Koniuchy in Nazi occupied Lithuania.
- January 30 – WWII:
  - The Battle of Cisterna opens as United States Army Rangers attempt to break out of the Anzio beachhead.
  - United States troops invade Majuro, Marshall Islands.
- January 31 – WWII: Battle of Kwajalein: American forces land on Kwajalein Atoll and other islands in the Japanese-held Marshall Islands.

=== February ===
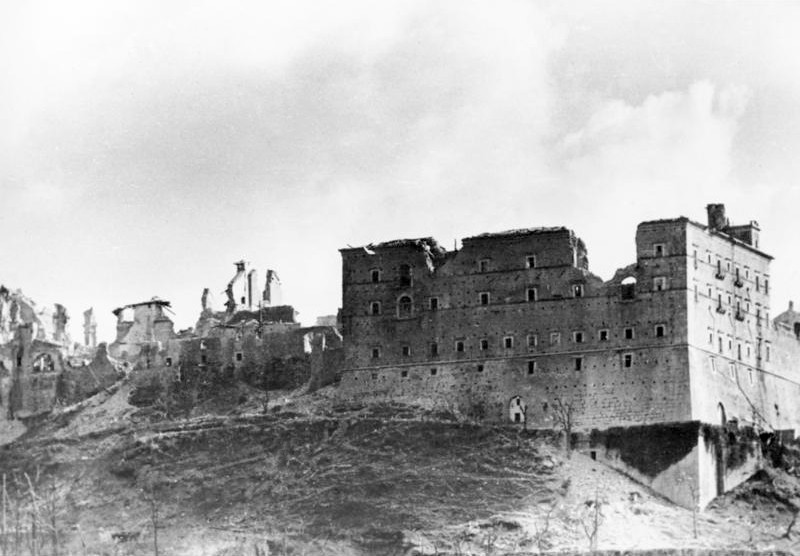
The Abbey of Monte Cassino in ruins after being destroyed by Allied bombing, February 1944.

- The Zadran tribe rises up against the Afghan government, starting the Afghan tribal revolts of 1944–1947.
- February 2 – The first issue of Human Events is published in Washington, D.C.
- February 3 – WWII: United States 4th Marine Division with the help of the 7th Infantry Division capture the Marshall Islands.
- February 7 – WWII: At Anzio, German forces launch a counteroffensive.
- February 8 – WWII:
  - 2,765 drown when American submarine USS Snook torpedoes Japanese troop transport Lima Maru.
  - 2,670 drown when British submarine HMS Sportsman torpedoes German-captured Petrella carrying Italian prisoners of war.
- February 14 – WWII: An anti-Japanese revolt breaks out on Java.
- February 15 – WWII: Battle of Monte Cassino – The monastery atop Monte Cassino is destroyed by Allied bombing.
- February 17 – WWII: Pacific War – The Battle of Eniwetok begins when U.S. forces invade the atoll in the Marshall Islands.
- February 18 – WWII: British light cruiser HMS Penelope is torpedoed and sunk by U-410 in the Mediterranean; 418 of her crew, including the captain, go down with the ship.
- February 20 – WWII:
  - The "Big Week" begins, with American bomber raids on German aircraft manufacturing centers.
  - The United States takes Eniwetok Atoll.
  - Norwegian heavy water sabotage: The Norwegian resistance sinks train ferry SF Hydro which is carrying a shipment of heavy water from the Vemork plant to Germany along Tinnsjå in Telemark.
- February 22 – WWII: The United States Strategic Air Forces in Europe is organized from the Eighth Air Force's strategic planning staff, subsuming strategic planning for all US Army Air Forces in Europe and Africa.
- February 23 – WWII:
  - Deportation of the Chechens and Ingush ("Operation Lentil"): Forced deportation of Chechens and Ingush people from North Caucasus to Kazakhstan and Kyrgyzstan in Central Asia by the Soviet authorities begins.
  - The Battle of Eniwetok concludes when U.S. forces secure the last islands in the Eniwetok Atoll.
- February 24 – WWII: American submarine USS Rasher torpedoes Japanese transports Ryūsei Maru and Tango Maru; 7,998 drown.
- February 26
  - Kurt Gerron was forced to begin shooting the Nazi propaganda film Theresienstadt in Theresienstadt concentration camp. He and many others who are featured in it are transferred to Auschwitz and gassed upon the film's completion.
  - Sue S. Dauser becomes the first woman appointed to the substantive rank of captain, in the United States Navy Nurse Corps.
- February 29 – WWII: Pacific War – The Admiralty Islands campaign (Operation Brewer) opens when U.S. forces land on Los Negros Island in the Admiralty Islands.

=== March ===
The March 1944 eruption of Mount Vesuvius.

- March – Austrian-born economist Friedrich Hayek publishes his book The Road to Serfdom in London.
- March 1 – WWII: American submarine USS Trout torpedoes Japanese troop transport ship Sakito Maru; 2,495 drown.
- March 2 – The 16th Academy Awards Ceremony is held, the first Oscar ceremony held at a large public venue, Grauman's Chinese Theatre in Hollywood. Casablanca, directed by Michael Curtiz, wins the Award for Best Picture.
- March 3
  - WWII: The Order of Nakhimov and the Order of Ushakov are instituted in the USSR.
  - Italy: in one of the deadliest railway disasters in history, over 500 clandestine passengers die of carbon monoxide poisoning when a steam freight train stops in a railway tunnel near Balvano, Basilicata, Southern Italy.
- March 4 – Louis Buchalter, the leader of 1930s crime syndicate Murder, Inc., is executed at Sing Sing prison, in Ossining, New York, along with Emanuel Weiss and Louis Capone.
- March 6 – WWII: Soviet Army planes attack Narva, Estonia, destroying over 95% of the town.
- March 9 – WWII: Soviet Army planes attack Tallinn, Estonia, killing 757 and leaving 25,000 homeless.
- March 10
  - In Britain, the prohibition on married women working as teachers is lifted.
- March 11 - Resistance leader Joop Westerweel is arrested while returning to the Netherlands, having escorted a group of Jewish children to safety in Spain.
- March 12 – WWII: The Political Committee of National Liberation is created in Greece.
- March 15
  - WWII: Battle of Monte Cassino: Allied aircraft bomb the monastery, and an assault is staged.
  - WWII: The National Council of the French Resistance approves the Resistance programme.
  - The Soviet Union introduces a new anthem, replacing The Internationale.
- March 18
  - The last eruption of Mount Vesuvius in Italy kills 26, and causes thousands to flee their homes.
  - WWII: The Nazis execute almost 400 prisoners, Soviet citizens and anti-fascist Romanians at Rîbnița.
- March 19
  - WWII: Operation Margarethe: German forces occupy Hungary.
  - The secular oratorio A Child of Our Time by Michael Tippett is premiered at the Adelphi Theatre in London.
- March 20 – WWII:
  - Landing on Emirau: 4,000 United States Marines land on Emirau Island in the Bismarck Archipelago to develop an airbase, as part of Operation Cartwheel.
  - British Royal Air Force Flight Sergeant Nicholas Alkemade's bomber is hit over Germany, and he has to bail out without a parachute from a height of over 4,000 meters (13,123 ft). Tree branches interrupt his fall and he lands safely on deep snow.
- March 23 – WWII: Members of the Italian Resistance attack Nazis marching in Via Rasella, killing 33.
- March 24 – WWII:
  - Ardeatine massacre: In Rome, 335 Italians are killed, including 75 Jews and over 200 members of the Italian Resistance from various groups.
  - In Markowa, Poland, German police kill Józef and Wiktoria Ulm, their 6 children and 8 Jews they were hiding.
  - The "Great Escape": 76 Royal Air Force prisoners of war escape by tunnel "Harry" from Stalag Luft III in Silesia this night. Only 3 men (2 Norwegians and a Dutchman) return to the UK; of those recaptured, 50 are summarily executed soon afterwards, in the Stalag Luft III murders.
- March 27 – In Sweden, Ruben Rausing patents Erik Wallenberg's method of packaging milk in paper, origin of the international company Tetra Pak.

=== April ===
- April 1 – The Swiss city of Schaffhausen is accidentally bombed by the United States causing serious damage to the city and killing or wounding more than 100 people.
- April 2 – WWII: Ascq massacre – Members of the 12th SS Panzer Division Hitlerjugend shoot 85 civilians suspected of blowing up their train on its approach to the Gare d'Ascq in France.
- April 4 – WWII:
  - Allied bombardment of Bucharest, Romania begins. The United States Air Force and British Royal Air Force, with approximately 3,640 bombers of different types, accompanied by about 1,830 fighters bomb Romania for the following 4½ months. As collateral damage, 5,524 inhabitants are killed, 3,373 injured, and 47,974 left homeless.
  - An Allied photoreconnaissance aircraft of 60 Squadron SAAF photographs part of Auschwitz concentration camp.
- April 10
  - The Holocaust: Rudolf Vrba and Alfréd Wetzler escape from Auschwitz concentration camp; on April 25–27 they prepare the Vrba–Wetzler report, one of the earliest and most detailed descriptions of the extermination of Jews in the camp.
  - WWII: As part of the Odessa Offensive, the Soviet 3rd Ukrainian Front liberated the city of Odessa in Southern Ukraine.
- April 14
  - Bombay Explosion: Freighter SS Fort Stikine, carrying a mixed cargo of ammunition, cotton bales and gold, explodes in harbour at Bombay (India), sinking surrounding ships and killing around 1,300 people.
  - WWII: As part of the Japanese-supported Axis forces led by Netaji Subhas Chandra Bose, fighting for India's liberation from British rule, Col. Shaukat Ali Malik of the Bahadur Group of the Indian National Army enters Moirang in modern-day Manipur in northeastern India and raises the flag of the Azri Hukumat e-Azad Hind for the first time on Indian soil. This is considered to be one of the first times in British Indian history where an army of liberation raises the national flag on Indian mainland.
- April 15 – Italian fascist philosopher Giovanni Gentile is assassinated in Florence by Bruno Fanciullacci, a member of the partisan Gruppi di Azione Patriottica.
- April 16 – WWII: Allied forces start bombing Belgrade, killing about 1,100 people. This bombing falls on the Orthodox Christian Easter.
- April 19 – WWII:
  - The Japanese launch the Operation Ichi-Go offensive in central and south China.
  - Semaine rouge: American and British planes bomb the city of Rouen.
- April 20 – Members of the Slovene Home Guard swear an oath to Hitler on his birthday at Bežigrad Stadium.
- April 22 – WWII: Battle of Hollandia – American forces disembark at Tanahmerah Bay and at Yos Sudarso Bay, near Hollandia. The landings are undertaken simultaneously with the amphibious invasion of Aitape ("Operation Persecution") to the east.
- April 25
  - The Holocaust: SS-Obersturmbannführer Adolf Eichmann opens "blood for goods" negotiations with Joel Brand, to offer the release of thousands of Jews from eastern Europe to the Hungarian Aid and Rescue Committee, in exchange for supplies for the German Eastern Front.
  - The United Negro College Fund is incorporated in the United States.
- April 26 – WWII:
  - German General Kreipe is kidnapped on Crete, Greece.
  - American submarine USS Jack torpedoes Japanese cargo carrier Yoshida Maru No. 1; 2,649 drown.
- April 28 – WWII: Allied convoy T4, forming part of amphibious Exercise Tiger (a full-scale rehearsal for the Normandy landings) in Start Bay, off the Devon coast of England, is attacked by E-boats, resulting in the deaths of 749 American servicemen from LSTs.

=== May ===
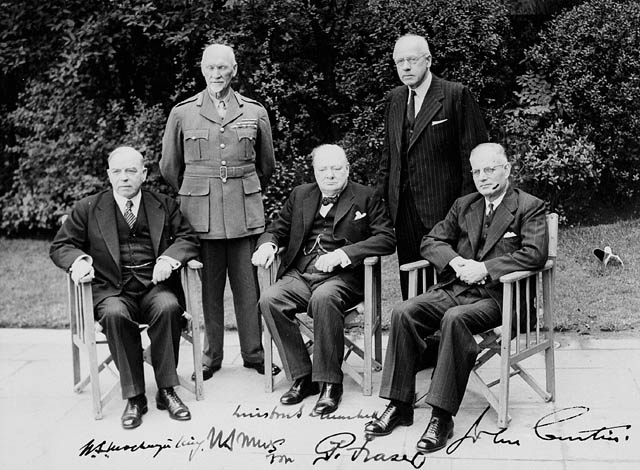
The prime ministers of Britain and the four major dominions at the 1944 Commonwealth Prime Ministers' Conference, May 1, 1944.

- May – Jean-Paul Sartre's existentialist drama No Exit (Huis Clos) premières in Nazi-occupied Paris.
- May 1 – WWII: Two hundred Communist prisoners are shot by the Germans at Kaisariani, Athens, Greece, in reprisal for the killing of General Franz Krech by Partisans at Molaoi.
- May 5 – WWII: Mohandas Gandhi is released from jail in India, on health grounds.
- May 9 – WWII: In the Soviet city of Sevastopol, Soviet troops completely drive out German forces, who had been ordered by Hitler to "fight to the last man."
- May 12 – WWII: Soviet troops finalize the liberation of the Crimea.
- May 14 – The Holocaust: Predominantly Muslim Albanian troops of the 21st Waffen Mountain Division of the SS Skanderbeg (1st Albanian) round up 281 Jews in Priština, and hand them over to the Germans for transportation to Bergen-Belsen concentration camp.
- May 15 – WWII: Allied military and political leaders, including Winston Churchill, Franklin Roosevelt, Dwight Eisenhower, George Patton, Bernard Montgomery and more, meet for the final D-Day joint briefing at St. Paul's School in London.
- May 15–July 8 – The Holocaust: Hungarian Jews are deported to Auschwitz and other Nazi concentration camps.
- May 17 – WWII: Merrill's Marauders and Chinese troops (some 3,000 men) led by Brigadier General Frank Merrill capture Myitkyina airfield, after a 100-kilometer march over the Kumon Mountain range (using mules for carrying supplies).
- May 18 – WWII:
  - Battle of Monte Cassino: The Germans evacuate Monte Cassino and Allied forces, led by Władysław Anders from Polish II Corps, take the stronghold after a struggle that has claimed 20,000 lives.
  - Crimean Tatars are deported by the Soviet Union.
- May 20 – WWII: Battle of Wakde: American forces of the 163rd Regimental Combat Team (some 1,500 men) under Brigadier General Jens Doe take the Japanese-held Wakde island (Dutch New Guinea).
- May 24 – WWII: West Loch disaster: Six LSTs are accidentally destroyed and 163 men killed, in Pearl Harbor.
- May 30 – Princess Charlotte Louise Juliette Louvet Grimaldi of Monaco, heir to the throne, resigns in favor of her son Prince Rainier Louis Henri Maxence Bertrand Grimaldi, who later reigns as Prince Rainier III of Monaco.
- May 31 – WWII: American destroyer escort USS England sinks the sixth Japanese submarine in two weeks. This anti-submarine warfare performance remains unmatched through the 20th century.

=== June ===
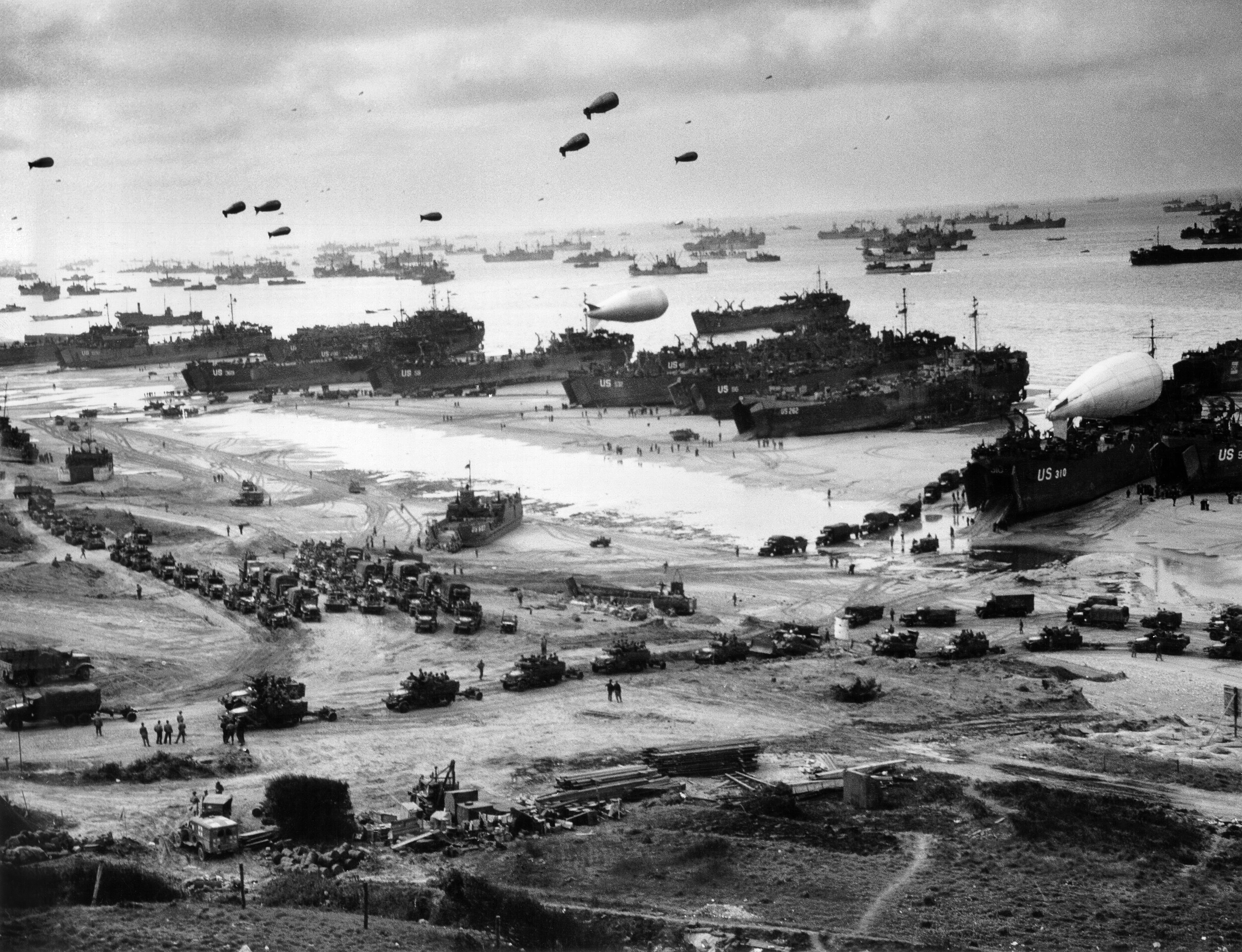
Allied troops land on the beaches of Normandy during D-Day.

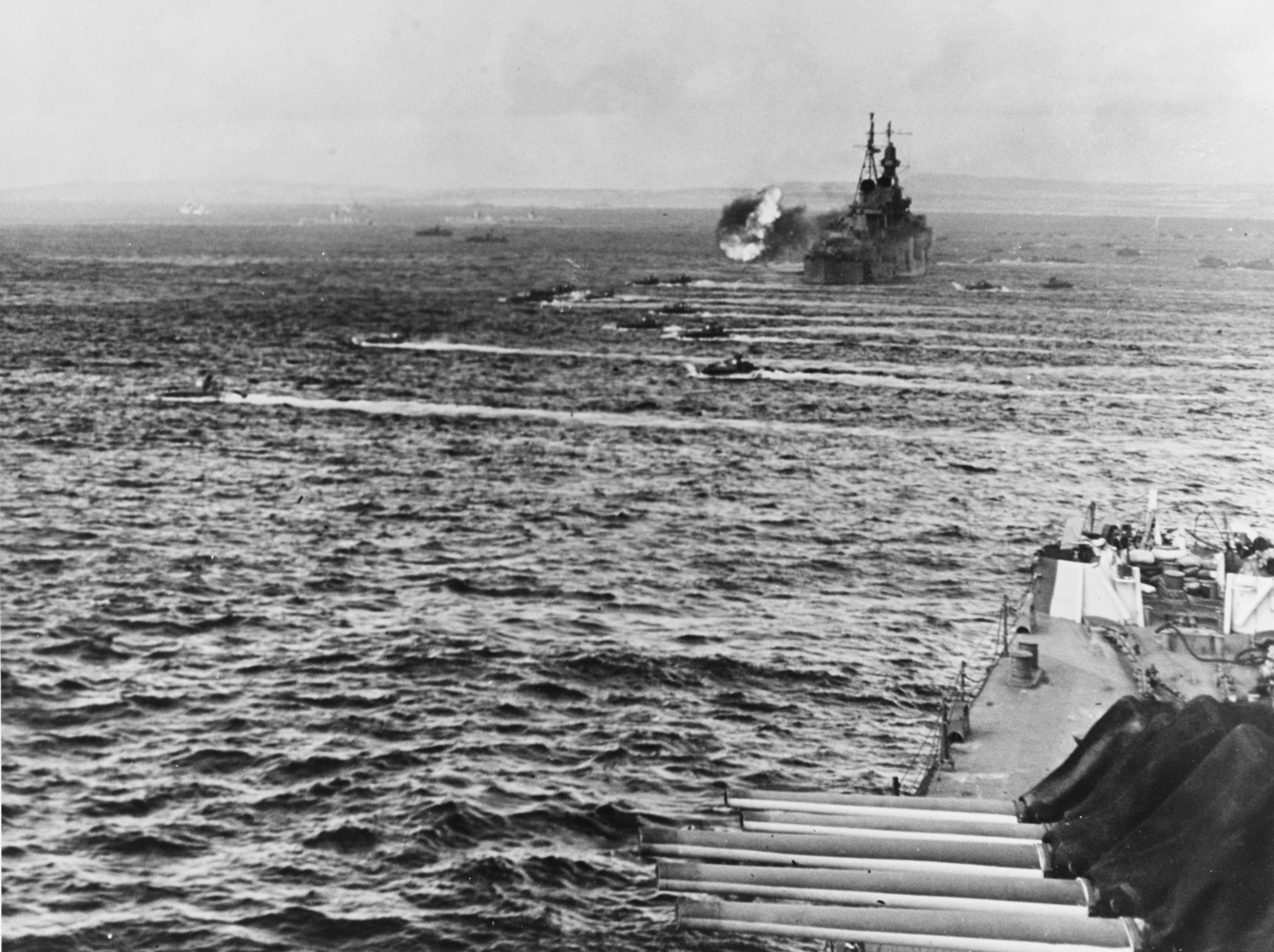
LVTs heading for shore on June 15, 1944, during the Battle of Saipan.

- June 1 – Two K-class blimps of the United States Navy complete the first transatlantic crossing by non-rigid airships, from the U.S. to French Morocco, with two stops.
- June 2 – WWII: The Provisional Government of the French Republic is established.
- June 3 – Hans Asperger publishes his paper on Asperger syndrome.
- June 4 – WWII:
  - Rome falls to the Allies, the first of the Axis capitals to fall.
  - A hunter-killer group of the United States Navy captures the German submarine U-505, marking the first time a U.S. Navy vessel has captured an enemy vessel at sea since the War of 1812. Some significant intelligence data is acquired.
- June 5 – WWII:
  - The German navy's Enigma messages are decoded in England almost in real time.
  - British Group Captain James Stagg correctly forecasts a brief improvement in weather conditions over the English Channel, which will permit the following day's Normandy landings to take place (having been deferred from today due to unfavourable weather).
  - At 10:15 p.m. local time, the BBC transmits coded messages including the second line of the Paul Verlaine poem "Chanson d'automne" to the French Resistance, indicating that the invasion of Europe is about to begin.
  - More than 1,000 British bombers drop 5,000 tons of bombs on German gun batteries on the Normandy coast, in preparation for D-Day.
  - US and British airborne divisions drop into Normandy, in preparation for D-Day.
  - D-Day naval deceptions are launched.
- June 6 – WWII: D-Day: Approximately 160,000 Allied troops shipped from England land on the beaches of Normandy in northern France, beginning Operation Overlord and the Invasion of Normandy. The Allied soldiers quickly break through the Atlantic Wall and push inland, in the largest amphibious military operation in history. This operation helps liberate France from Germany, and also weakens the Nazi hold on Europe.
- June 7 – WWII:
  - Bayeux is liberated by British troops.
  - Operation Perch, a British attempt to capture Caen from the Germans, commences; it is abandoned on June 14.
  - Joel Brand is intercepted by British agents in Aleppo.
- June 9 – WWII: Soviet leader Joseph Stalin launches the Vyborg–Petrozavodsk Offensive against Finland, with the intent of defeating Finland before pushing for Berlin.
  - The steamer Tanais, also known as Danae (Greek: Δανάη), carrying 600 Cretans (including around 300 Greek Jews) on the first leg of the journey to Auschwitz, is sunk, with no known survivors, off Santorini.
- June 10 – WWII: Oradour-sur-Glane massacre: 642 men, women and children are killed in France in a reprisal attack by the Waffen-SS.
- June 13 – WWII: Germany launches the first V-1 flying bomb attack on London.
- June 15 – WWII: Battle of Saipan: United States forces land on Saipan.
- June 15–16 – WWII: Bombing of Yawata – The United States Army Air Forces conduct the first air raid on the Japanese home islands.
- June 16 – At age 14, African-American teenage boy George Stinney Jr. becomes the youngest person ever executed by electric chair in the United States. His conviction was vacated 70 years later, in 2014, due to him not receiving a fair trial.
- June 17 – Iceland declares full independence from Denmark.
- June 19 – WWII: A severe storm badly damages the Mulberry harbours on the Normandy coast.
- June 20 – WWII: A V-2 rocket becomes the first man-made object to cross the Kármán line and reach the edge of space.
- June 22 – WWII:
  - Operation Bagration: A general attack by Soviet forces clears the German forces from Belarus, resulting in the destruction of German Army Group Centre, possibly the greatest defeat of the Wehrmacht during WWII.
  - Burma Campaign: The Battle of Kohima ends in a British victory.
- June 23 – The Holocaust: Maurice Rossel of the International Committee of the Red Cross visits Theresienstadt concentration camp, uncritically accepting the propaganda view of it presented by the Schutzstaffel.
- June 25 – WWII:
  - Battle of Tali-Ihantala (the largest battle ever in the Nordic countries): Finland is able to resist the Soviet attack, and thus manages to remain an independent nation.
  - Cherbourg is bombarded by ships of the United States Navy and British Royal Navy, in support of U.S. ground troops.
- June 26 – WWII: American troops enter Cherbourg.
- June 29 – WWII: American submarine USS Sturgeon torpedoes Japanese troop transport Toyama Maru; 5,400 drown.
- June 30 – WWII: American submarine USS Tang torpedoes Japanese troop transport SS Nikkin Maru; 3,219 drown.

=== July ===
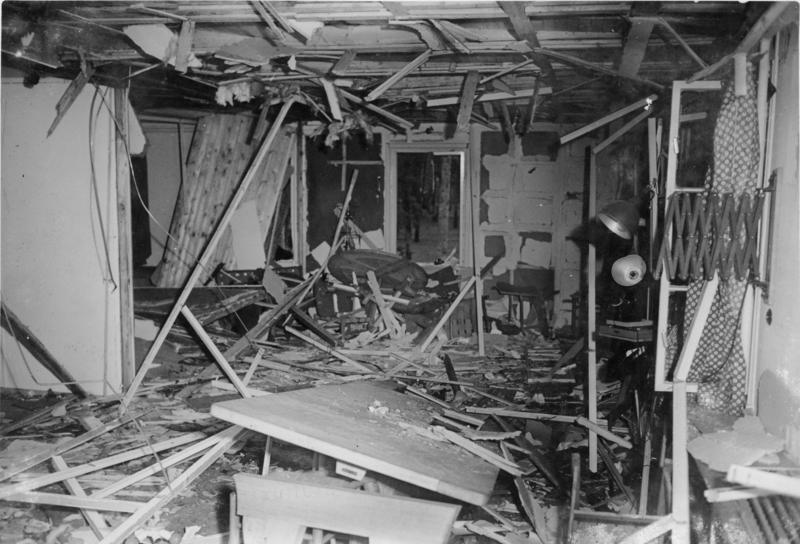
Aftermath of the failed 20 July plot to kill Hitler.

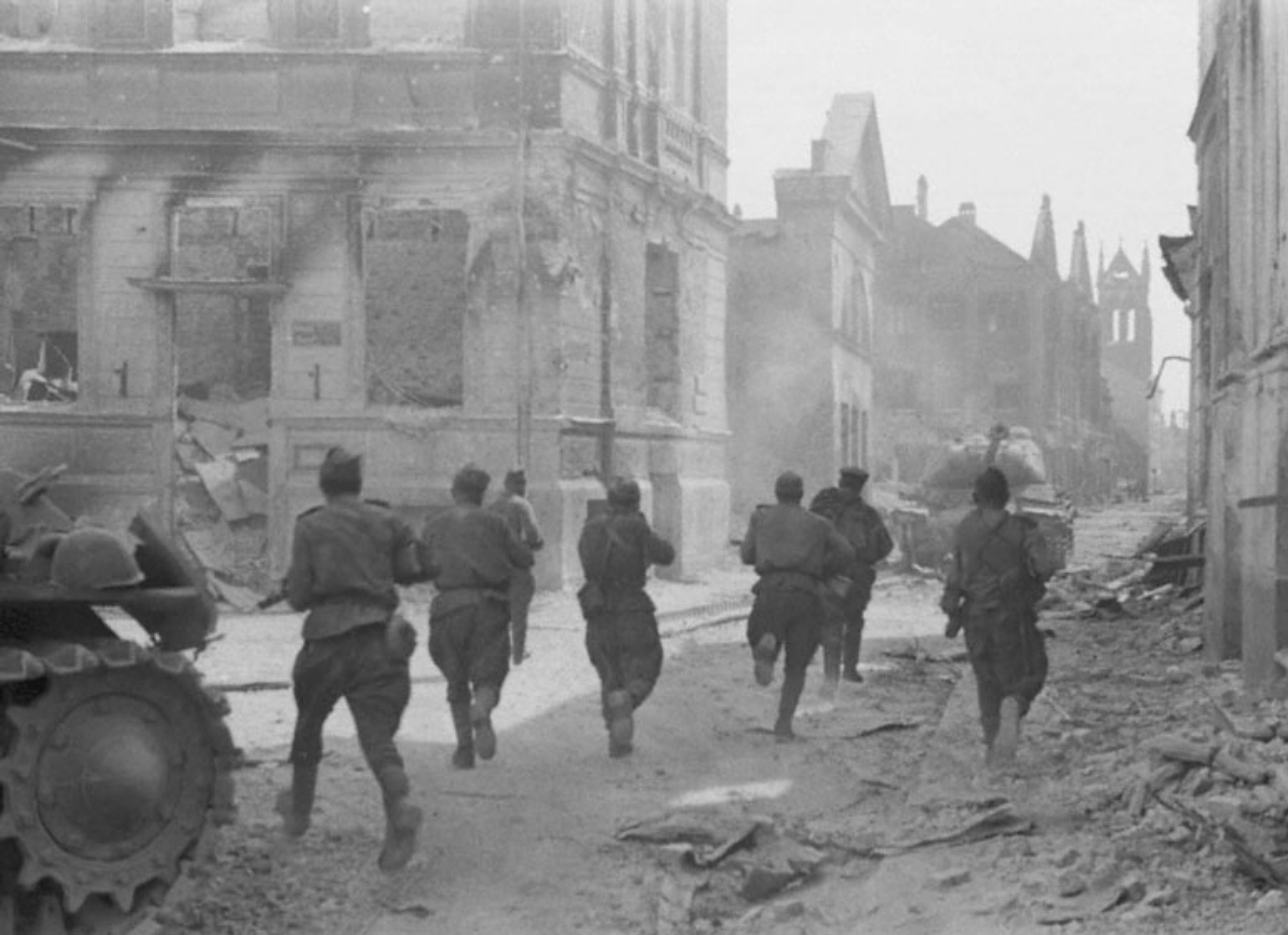
Soviet soldiers fight in the streets of Jelgava, summer 1944.

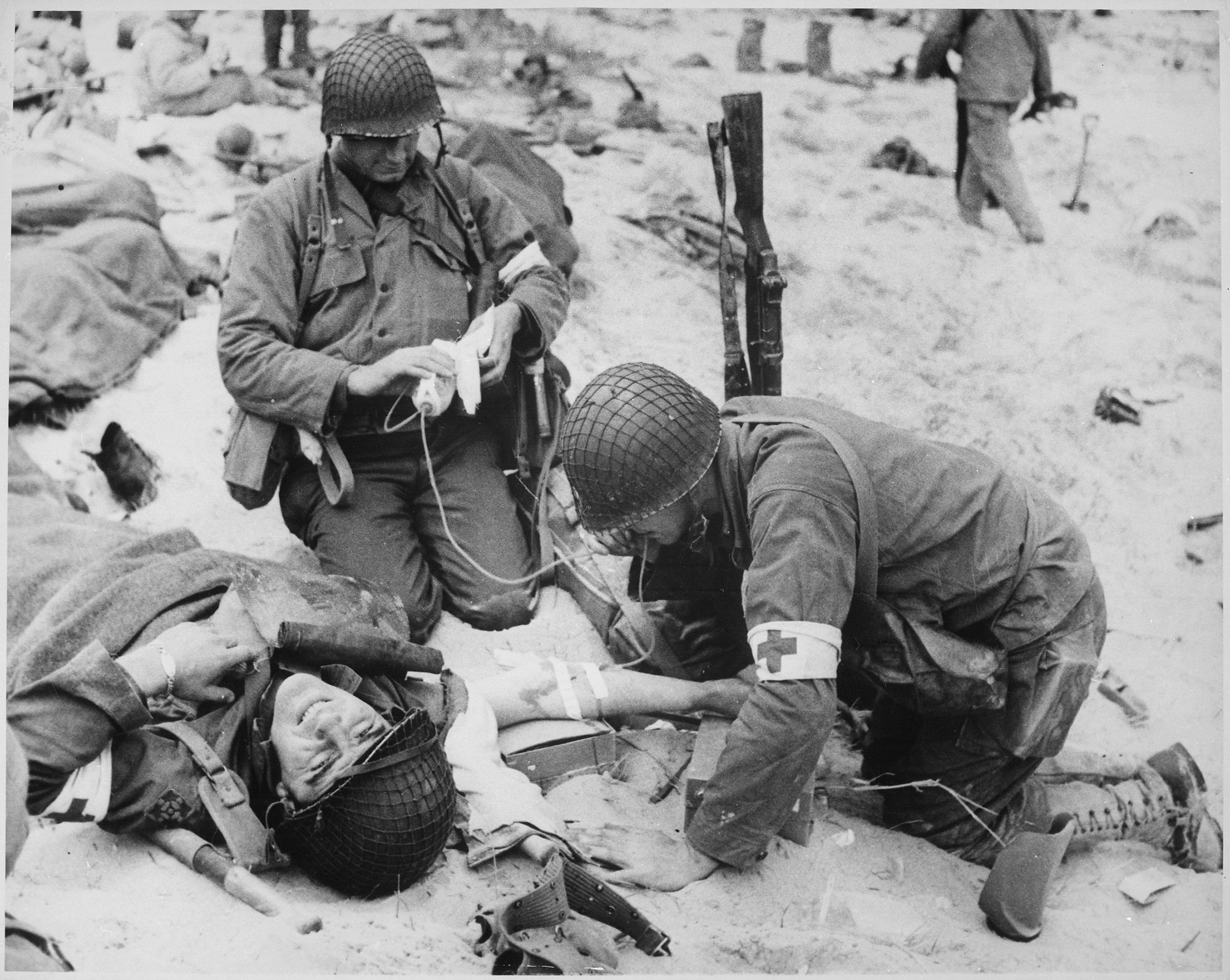
American medics helping injured soldier in France, 1944.

- July–October – WWII: Germans are driven out of Lithuania leading to reimposition of the Lithuanian Soviet Socialist Republic.
- July 1 – The United Nations Monetary and Financial Conference begins at Bretton Woods, New Hampshire, United States.
- July 3 – WWII:
  - Soviet troops liberate Minsk.
  - Battle of Imphal: Japanese forces call off their advance, ending the battle with a British victory.
- July 4 – WWII: Operation Windsor: Canadian forces of the 3rd Canadian Infantry Division attack Carpiquet airfield defended by German troops of the 12th SS Panzer Division Hitlerjugend of Panzergruppe West.
- July 6 – WWII: At Camp Hood, Texas, future baseball star and 1st Lt. Jackie Robinson is arrested and later court-martialed, for refusing to move to the back of a segregated U.S. Army bus (he is eventually acquitted).
- July 9 – WWII: British and Canadian forces capture Caen.
- July 10–11 – WWII: Operation Jupiter during the Battle of Normandy of World War II: British strategic victory over German Panzer Corps.
- July 10 – WWII: Soviet troops begin operations to liberate the Baltic countries from Nazi occupation.
- July 12–21 – WWII: Dortan massacre – 35–36 French civilians are killed by Ostlegionen (Cossacks) serving with the Wehrmacht.
- July 13 – WWII: Vilnius is freed by Soviet forces.
- July 16 – WWII:
  - Adolf Hitler departs Berchtesgaden for what will be the final time as he flies to the Wolf's Lair, aborting Operation Foxley, a British plot to assassinate him.
  - The first contingent of the Brazilian Expeditionary Force arrives in Italy.
- July 17 – WWII:
  - The largest convoy of the war embarks from Halifax Harbour, Nova Scotia, under Royal Canadian Navy protection.
  - Port Chicago disaster: The SS E. A. Bryan, loaded with ammunition, explodes at the Port Chicago, California, Naval Magazine, killing 320 sailors and civilian personnel.
- July 18 – WWII:
  - American forces push back the Germans in Saint-Lô, capturing the city.
  - British forces launch Operation Goodwood, an armoured offensive aimed at driving the Germans from the high ground to the south of Caen. The offensive ends 2 days later with minimal gains.
  - Hideki Tōjō resigns as Prime Minister of Japan due to numerous setbacks in the war effort and is succeeded on July 22 by Kuniaki Koiso.
- July 20
  - WWII: Adolf Hitler survives the 20 July plot to assassinate him led by Claus von Stauffenberg; he and his fellow conspirators in this and Operation Valkyrie are executed the following day.
  - The annular solar eclipse of July 20, 1944 is visible in Africa, Indian Ocean, Asia, Pacific Ocean and Australia, and is the 35th solar eclipse of Solar Saros 135.
- July 21 – WWII:
  - Battle of Guam: American troops land on Guam (the battle ends August 10).
  - The Soviet-sponsored Polish Committee of National Liberation is created, in opposition to the Polish government-in-exile.
- July 22
  - The Bretton Woods Conference ends with agreements signed to set up the International Bank for Reconstruction and Development, General Agreement on Tariffs and Trade and International Monetary Fund.
  - The new Polish Committee of National Liberation publishes the PKWN Manifesto in Chełm, calling for a continuation of fighting against Nazi Germany, radical reforms including nationalisation of industry, and a "decent border in the West" (the Oder–Neisse line).
  - United States v. Masaaki Kuwabara, the only Japanese American draft avoidance case to be dismissed on a due process violation of the U.S. Constitution.
- July 23 – The Holocaust: Majdanek concentration camp is liberated by the Soviet Red Army and much incriminating evidence of the atrocities committed there is found.
- July 25 – WWII:
  - Operation Spring: One of the bloodiest days for Canadian forces during the war results in 1,550 casualties, including 450 killed, during the Normandy Campaign.
  - Operation Cobra: American forces launch an air and ground offensive against the German defenders in western Normandy, forcing them to retreat.
  - Battle of Tannenberg Line (or "Battle of the Blue Hills") in northeastern Estonia begins: The Red Army will gain a Pyrrhic victory by August 10.
- July 26 – WWII: A Messerschmitt Me 262 becomes the first jet fighter aircraft to have an operational victory.
- July 27 – WWII: Soviet forces liberate Lvov, Stanislav and Białystok, and the following day enter Brest, Belarus.
- July 30 – WWII: Operation Bluecoat: British forces launch a ground offensive to secure the road junction of Vire and the high ground of Mont Pinçon.
- July 31 – WWII: American submarine USS Parche torpedoes Japanese troop transport Yoshino Maru; 2,495 drown.

=== August ===
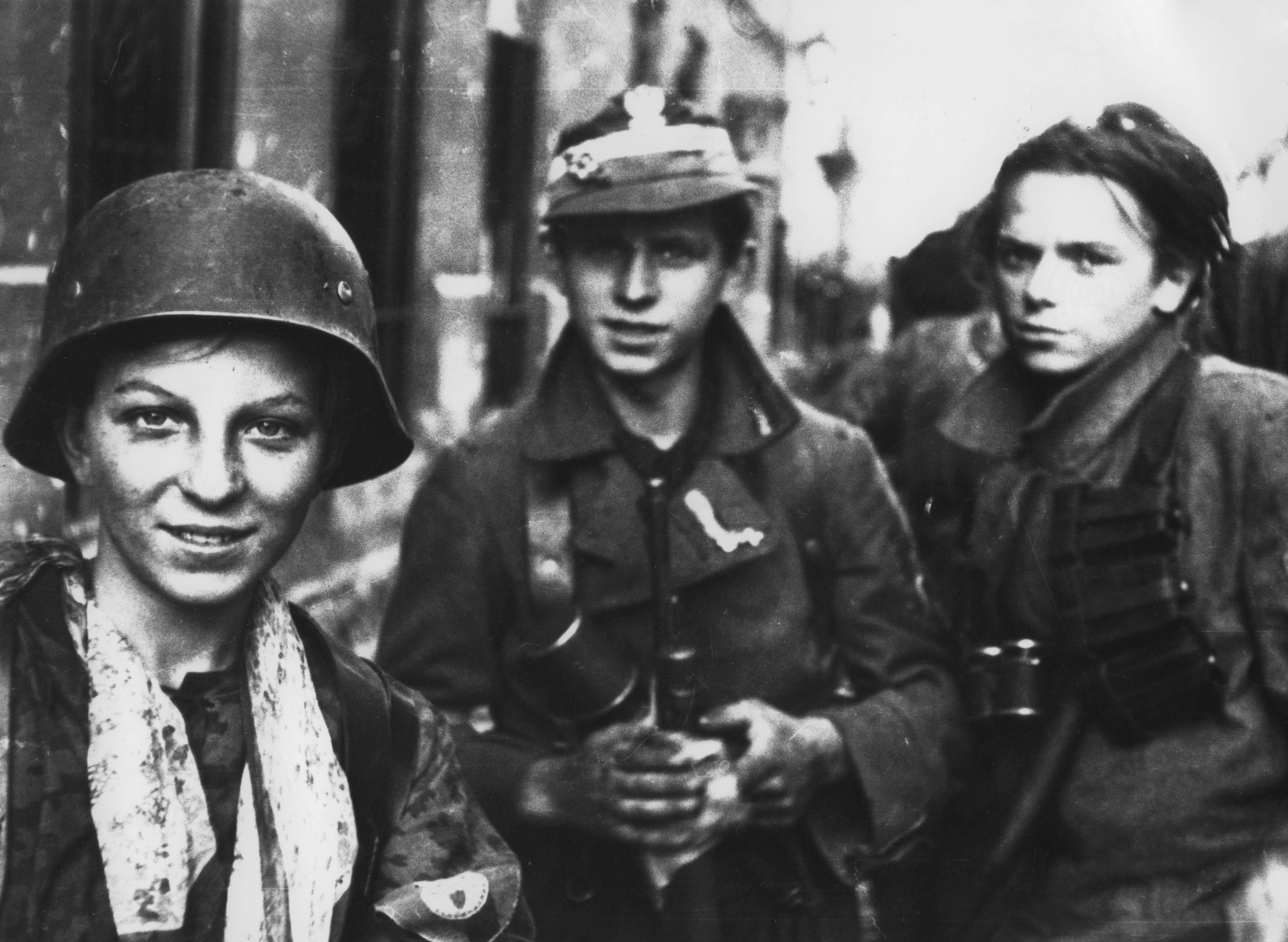
Szare Szeregi Scouts also fought in the Warsaw Uprising.

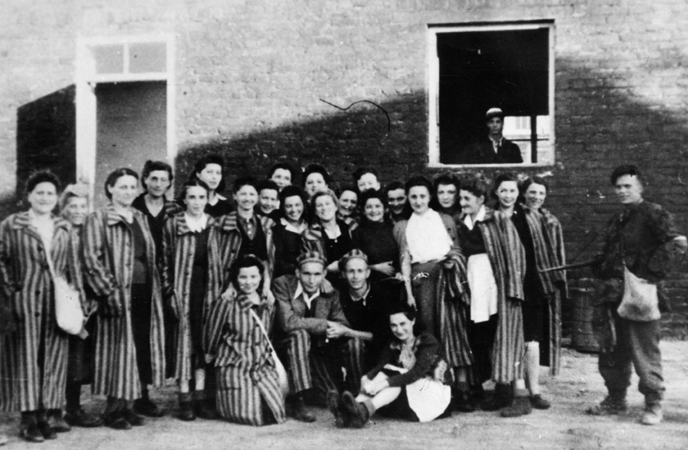
Jewish prisoners of Gęsiówka liberated by Polish soldiers from Batalion Zośka, August 5, 1944.

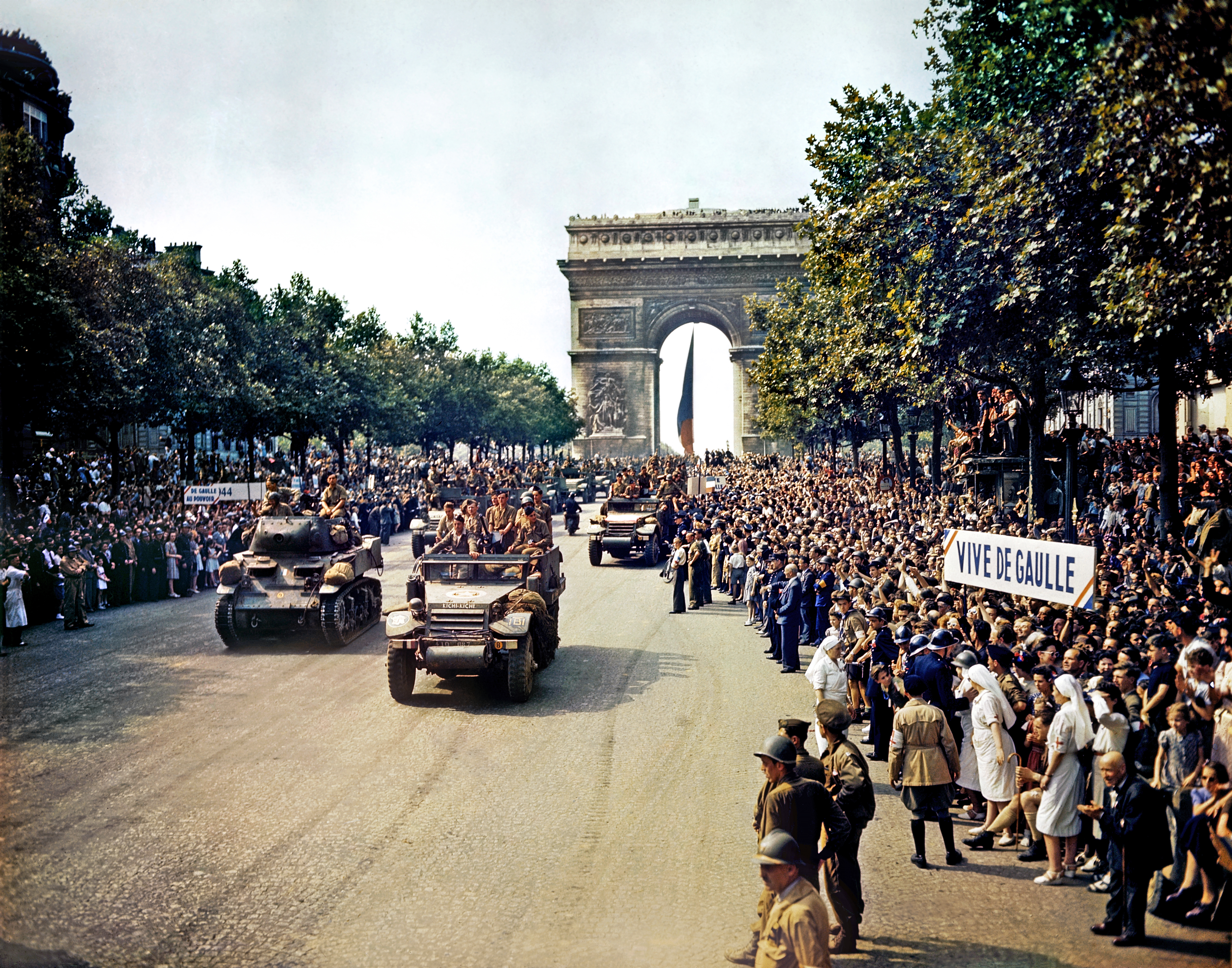
Crowds of French people line the Champs Élysées following the Liberation of Paris, August 26, 1944.

- August 1
  - WWII: The Warsaw Uprising begins.
  - WWII: Soviet forces liberate Kaunas.
- August 2 – WWII:
  - Turkey ends diplomatic and economic relations with Germany.
  - The First Assembly of ASNOM (the Anti-Fascist Assembly for the People's Liberation of Macedonia) is held in the Prohor Pčinjski monastery.
- August 3 – The Education Act in the United Kingdom, promoted by Rab Butler, provides for the postwar education system, including free secondary education for children of both sexes and raising of the school leaving age to 15.
- August 4 – WWII:
  - The Holocaust: A tip from a Dutch informer leads the Gestapo to a sealed-off area in an Amsterdam warehouse, where they find Jewish diarist Anne Frank, her family, and others in hiding. All will die in captivity, except for Otto Frank, Anne's father.
  - The Finnish Parliament, by derogation, elects Marshal C. G. E. Mannerheim as President of Finland to replace Risto Ryti, who has resigned.
- August 5 – WWII:
  - The Warsaw Uprising:
    - The Wola massacre begins. Between now and August 12, 40,000 to 50,000 Polish civilians will be indiscriminately massacred by occupying SS troops.
    - The Holocaust: Polish insurgents liberate a German labor camp in Warsaw, freeing 348 Jewish prisoners.
  - Cowra breakout: Over 500 Japanese prisoners of war attempt a mass breakout from the Cowra camp in Australia. In the ensuing manhunt, 231 Japanese escapees and four Australian soldiers are killed.
- August 7 – IBM dedicates the first program-controlled calculator, the Automatic Sequence Controlled Calculator (known best as the Harvard Mark I).
- August 9 – The United States Forest Service and the Wartime Advertising Council release the first posters featuring Smokey Bear.
- August 12 – WWII:
  - The Allies capture Florence, Italy.
  - Sant'Anna di Stazzema massacre: The Waffen-SS and Black Brigades paramilitaries murder about 560 civilians and refugees (including more than 100 children) in the Italian village of Sant'Anna di Stazzema, burn their bodies, and leave their houses semi-derelict.
  - In the Kara Sea, German submarine U-365 torpedoes the passenger-cargo ship Marina Raskova; 618 people die.
  - Operation Pluto: The world's first undersea oil pipeline is laid between England and France.
- August 15 – WWII: Operation Dragoon lands Allies in southern France. The U.S. 45th Infantry Division participates in its fourth assault landing at Sainte-Maxime, spearheading the drive for the Belfort Gap.
- August 18 – WWII: American submarine USS Rasher sinks Teia Maru, Eishin Maru, Teiyu Maruqq and aircraft carrier Taiyō from Japanese convoy HI71, in one of the most effective American "wolfpack" attacks of the war.
- August 19 – WWII:
  - American submarine USS Spadefish torpedoes Japanese landing craft depot ship Tamatsu Maru; more than 4,400 Japanese servicemen drown.
  - Liberation of Paris starts with resistance forces staging an insurrection against the German occupiers.
- August 20 – WWII:
  - American forces successfully defeat Nazi forces at Chambois, closing the Falaise Pocket.
  - 168 captured Allied airmen, including Phil Lamason, accused of being "terror fliers" by the Gestapo, arrive at Buchenwald concentration camp, where they form the KLB Club.
- August 21
  - The Dumbarton Oaks Conference (Washington Conversations on International Peace and Security Organization) opens in Washington, D.C.: U.S., British, Chinese, French and Soviet representatives meet to plan the foundation of the United Nations.
  - WWII: Operation Tractable concludes when Canadian troops relieve the Polish and link with the Americans, capturing remaining German forces in the Falaise Pocket, and securing the strategically important French town of Falaise, in the final offensive of the Battle of Normandy.
- August 22 – WWII:
  - Tsushima Maru, an unmarked Japanese passenger/cargo ship, is sunk by torpedoes launched by the submarine USS Bowfin off Akuseki-jima, killing 1,484 civilians, including 767 schoolchildren.
  - Holocaust of Kedros: German Wehrmacht infantry begin an intimidatory razing operation, killing 164, against the civilian residents of nine villages in the Amari Valley on the occupied Greek island of Crete.
- August 23 – WWII:
  - King Michael's Coup: Ion Antonescu, Conducator of Romania, and Mihai Antonescu, Foreign Minister of Romania, are arrested and a new military government established. Romania leaves the war against the Soviet Union, joining the Allies. General Constantin Sanatescu is the "armed force" of the coup d'état and will be appointed by King Michael of Romania as prime minister of Romania on September 1.
  - Padule di Fucecchio massacre: At least 174 Italian civilians are killed by members of the 23rd Infantry Division (Wehrmacht) as a reprisal for the wounding of two soldiers.
- August 24 – WWII:
  - Liberation of Paris: Forces of Free France are the first of the Allies to enter Paris.
  - As part of the Second Jassy–Kishinev offensive, the Soviet 3rd Ukrainian Front liberates the city of Chișinău.
  - At Buchères in France, men of the 51st SS-Brigade massacre 68 civilians (half of them women) aged from 6 months to above seventy years.
  - Japanese vessels attack and sink the submarine USS Harder off Luzon.
- August 25 – WWII:
  - German surrender of Paris:The Allies enter Paris in force and General Dietrich von Choltitz surrenders the city to them, in defiance of Hitler's orders to destroy it. This successfully completes Operation Overlord.
  - Maillé massacre: 124 civilians (70% women and children) are massacred by the Gestapo at Maillé, Indre-et-Loire.
  - Hungary decides to continue the war together with Germany.
  - The Red Ball Express convoy system begins operation, supplying tons of materiel to Allied forces in France.
- August 28 – WWII: Operation Dragoon – The Free French Army liberates the cities of Marseille and Nice.
- August 29 – WWII: The Slovak National Uprising against the Axis powers begins.
- August 31
  - WWII: The Romanian capital Bucharest is captured by the Red Army.
  - The Mad Gasser of Mattoon apparently resumes his mysterious attacks in Mattoon, Illinois for two weeks.

=== September ===
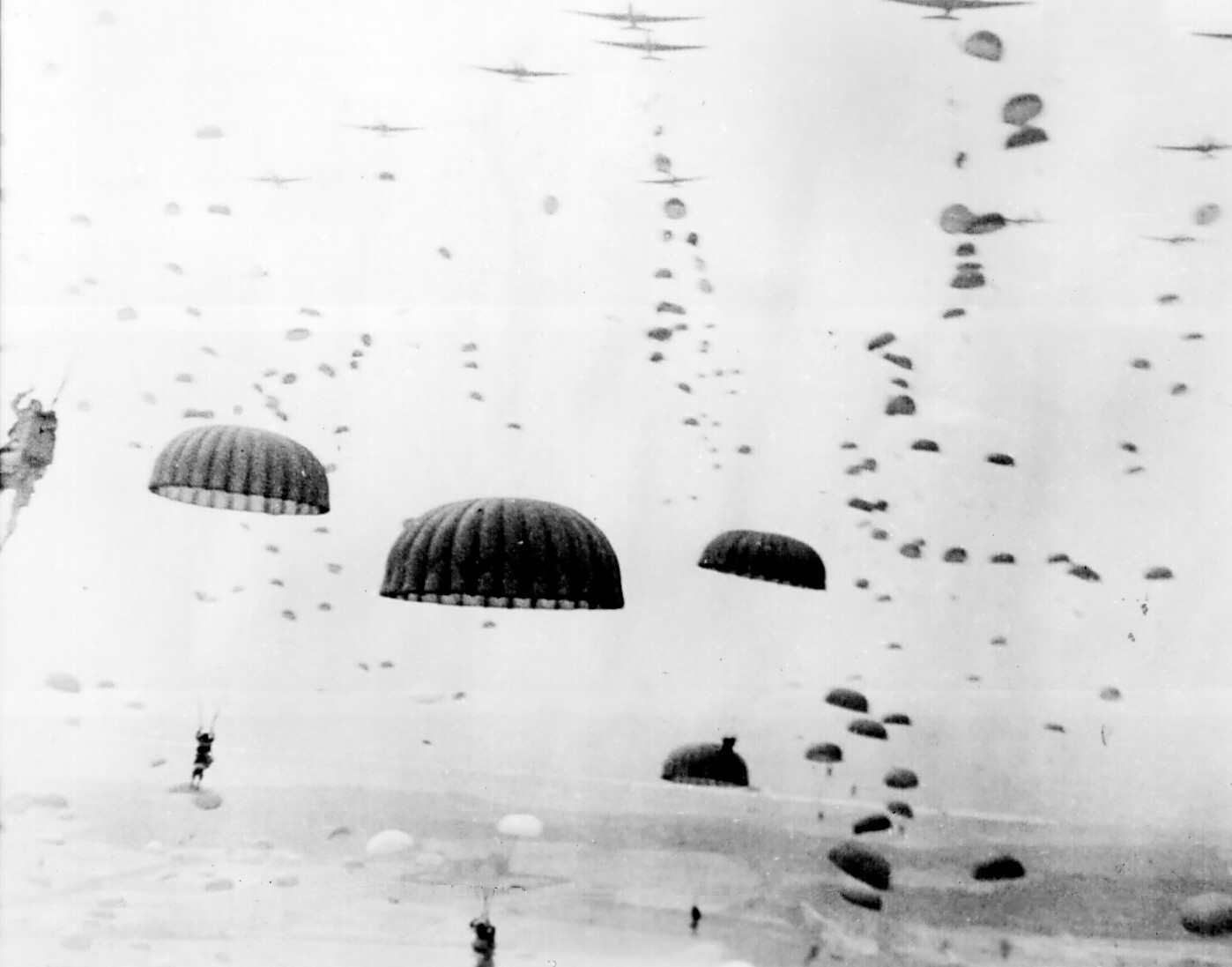
Waves of paratroopers land in the Netherlands during Operation Market Garden in September 1944.

- September – The Dutch famine ("Hongerwinter") begins, in the occupied northern part of the Netherlands.
- September 2
  - WWII: In Bulgaria, the Bagryanov government resigns. Konstantin Muraviev becomes new prime minister.
  - ¡Hola! magazine is launched in Barcelona.
  - The last execution of a Finn in Finland will take place when soldier Olavi Laiho is executed by shooting in Oulu.
- September 3
  - WWII: The Allies liberate Brussels and Lyon.
  - The Holocaust: Diarist Anne Frank and her family are placed on the last transport train from Westerbork to Auschwitz concentration camp, arriving 3 days later.
- September 4 – WWII:
  - The British 11th Armoured Division liberates the city of Antwerp, Belgium. The White Brigade of the Belgian Resistance ensures that the port facilities are largely intact, but they cannot be used until the Walcheren peninsila can be cleared of German troops.
  - Finland breaks off relations with Germany.
- September 5
  - WWII: The Soviet Union declares war on Bulgaria.
  - Belgium, Netherlands and Luxembourg constitute Benelux as representatives of the exiled governments sign the London Customs Convention.
- September 6 – WWII: The Tartu Offensive in Estonia concludes, with Soviet forces capturing Tartu.
- September 7 – WWII:
  - The Belgian government in exile returns to Brussels from London.
  - Members of Vichy France's collaborationist government are relocated to Germany where an enclave is established for them in Sigmaringen Castle.
  - Shin'yō Maru incident: Japanese cargo ship SS Shinyō Maru is torpedoed and sunk in the Sulu Sea by American submarine USS Paddle while carrying 750 American prisoners of war; 688 perish.
- September 8 – WWII:
  - The first V-2 rocket attack on London takes place, launched from The Hague.
  - Soviet forces begin the one and a half month-long Battle of the Dukla Pass.
  - The French town of Menton is liberated from German forces.
  - Bulgaria declares war on Germany.
- September 9 – WWII: The Bulgarian government is overthrown by the Fatherland Front coalition, which establishes a pro-Soviet government.
- September 10 – WWII: Liberation of Luxembourg.
- September 11 – WWII:
  - The Laksevåg floating dry dock at Bergen (Norway) is sunk by British X-class submarine X-24.
  - An approaching formation of 36 US bombers is engaged by a German fighter squadron (Jagdgeschwader) in the Battle over the Ore Mountains. After the first German attack on the bombers, US Mustangs attack the German squadron in aerial dogfights.
- September 12 – WWII: Allied forces from Operation Overlord (in northern France) and Operation Dragoon (in the south) link up near Dijon.
- September 13 – WWII: The Battle of Meligalas begins, between the Greek Resistance forces of the Greek People's Liberation Army (ELAS) and the collaborationist Security Battalions.
- September 14
  - WWII: The Baltic offensive of Soviet troops begins.
  - The Great Atlantic hurricane makes landfall killing 390 people from North Carolina to New England.
- September 15 – WWII: The Battle of Peleliu begins in the Pacific.
- September 17 – WWII: Operation Market Garden: Allied airborne landings begin in the Netherlands and Germany.
- September 17–20 – WWII: Italian Campaign – In the Battle of San Marino, British and Empire forces take the occupied neutral republic of San Marino from the German Army.
- September 18 – WWII:
  - British submarine HMS Tradewind torpedoes Japanese "hell ship" Jun'yō Maru; 5,620 drown, mostly Javanese forced laborers and Allied prisoners of war.
  - After German forces declare the evacuation of Estonia the day before, the Estonian national government briefly resumes control of Tallinn before the Soviet advance.
- September 19 – WWII:
  - The Moscow Armistice between Finland and the Soviet Union is signed, ending the Continuation War.
  - The Battle of Hürtgen Forest begins, east of the Belgian–German border.
- September 22 – WWII: The Red Army captures Tallinn, Estonia. Prime Minister in Duties of the President of Estonia Jüri Uluots and 80,000 Estonian civilians manage to escape to Sweden and Germany. The evacuees include almost the entire population of Estonian Swedes. Soviet bombing raids on the evacuating ships sink several, with thousands on board.
- September 24 – WWII: The U.S. 45th Infantry Division takes the strongly defended city of Épinal in France before crossing the Moselle River and entering the western foothills of the Vosges.
- September 26 – WWII:
  - Operation Market Garden ends in an Allied withdrawal.
  - On the middle front of the Gothic Line, Brazilian troops control the Serchio valley region after 10 days of fighting.

=== October ===
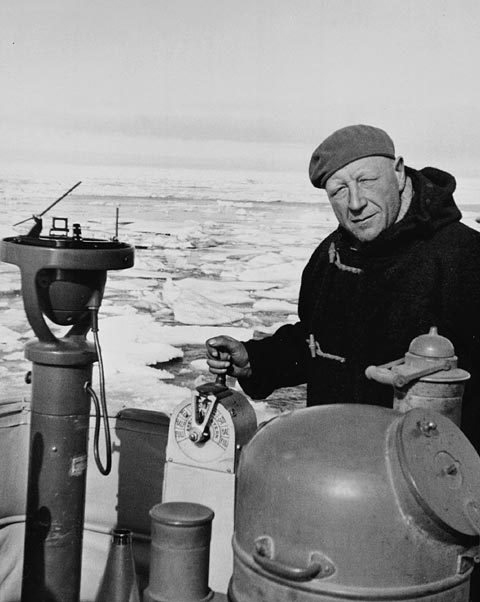
Henry Larsen becomes the first person successfully to navigate the Northwest Passage in both directions, July–October 1944.

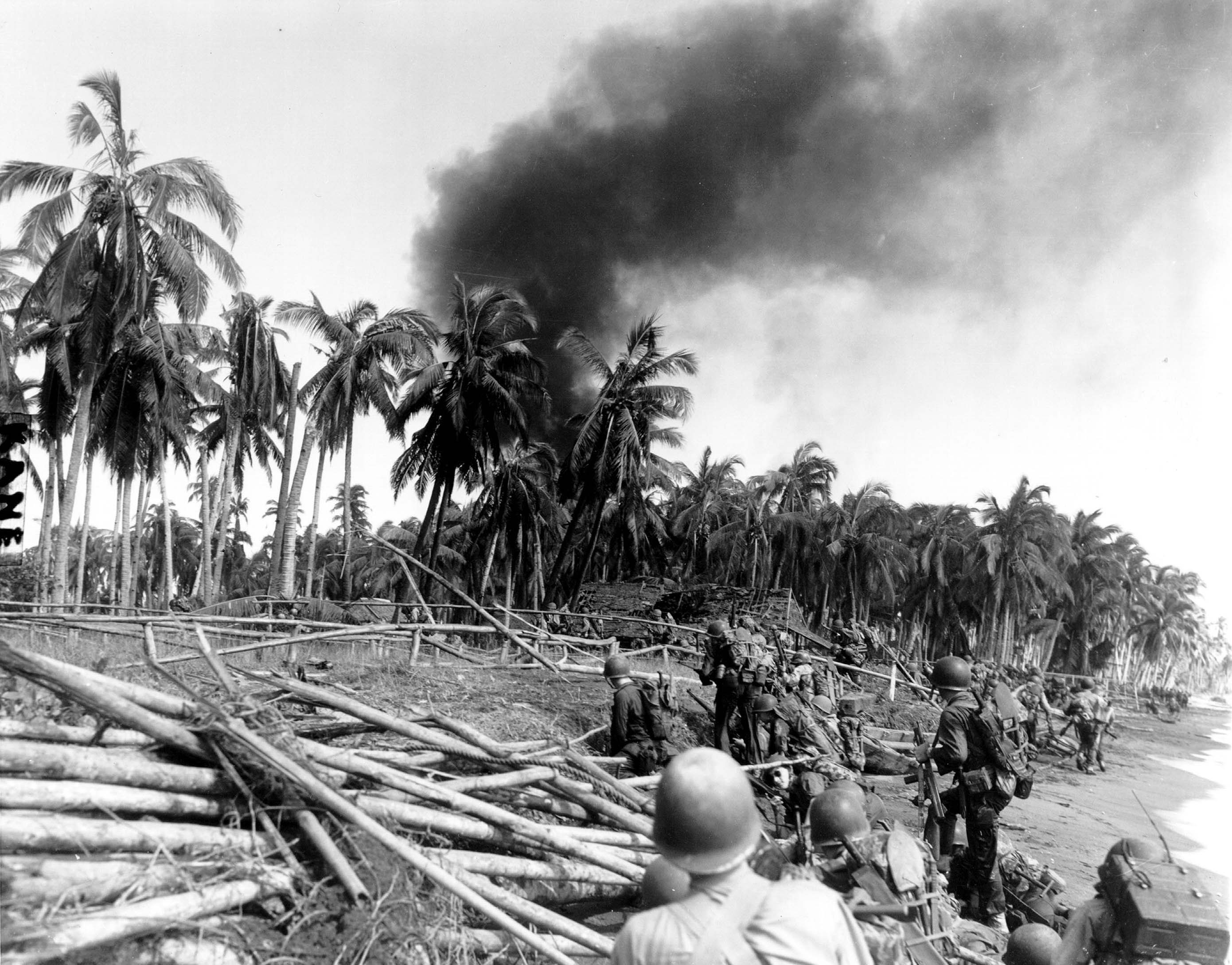
American troops advance towards San Jose on Leyte Island, October 20, 1944.

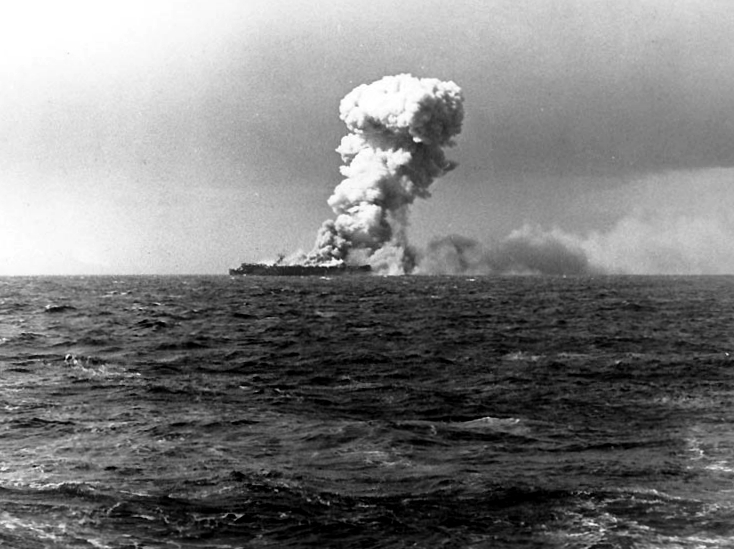
Light aircraft carrier USS Princeton afire, east of Luzon, October 24, 1944.

Volkssturm founded in October 1944.

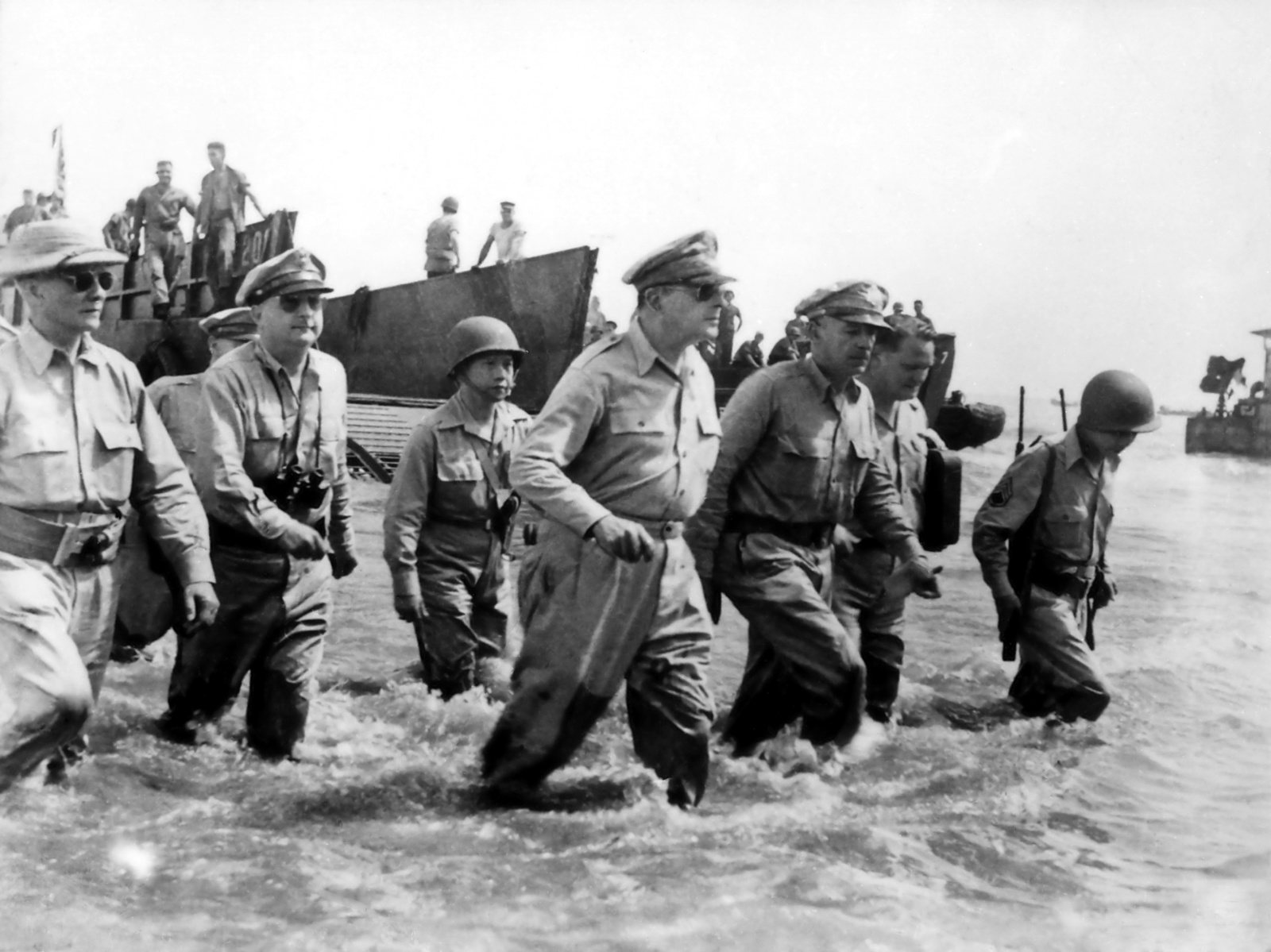
Battle of Leyte begins – General MacArthur returns to the Philippines, October 20, 1944.

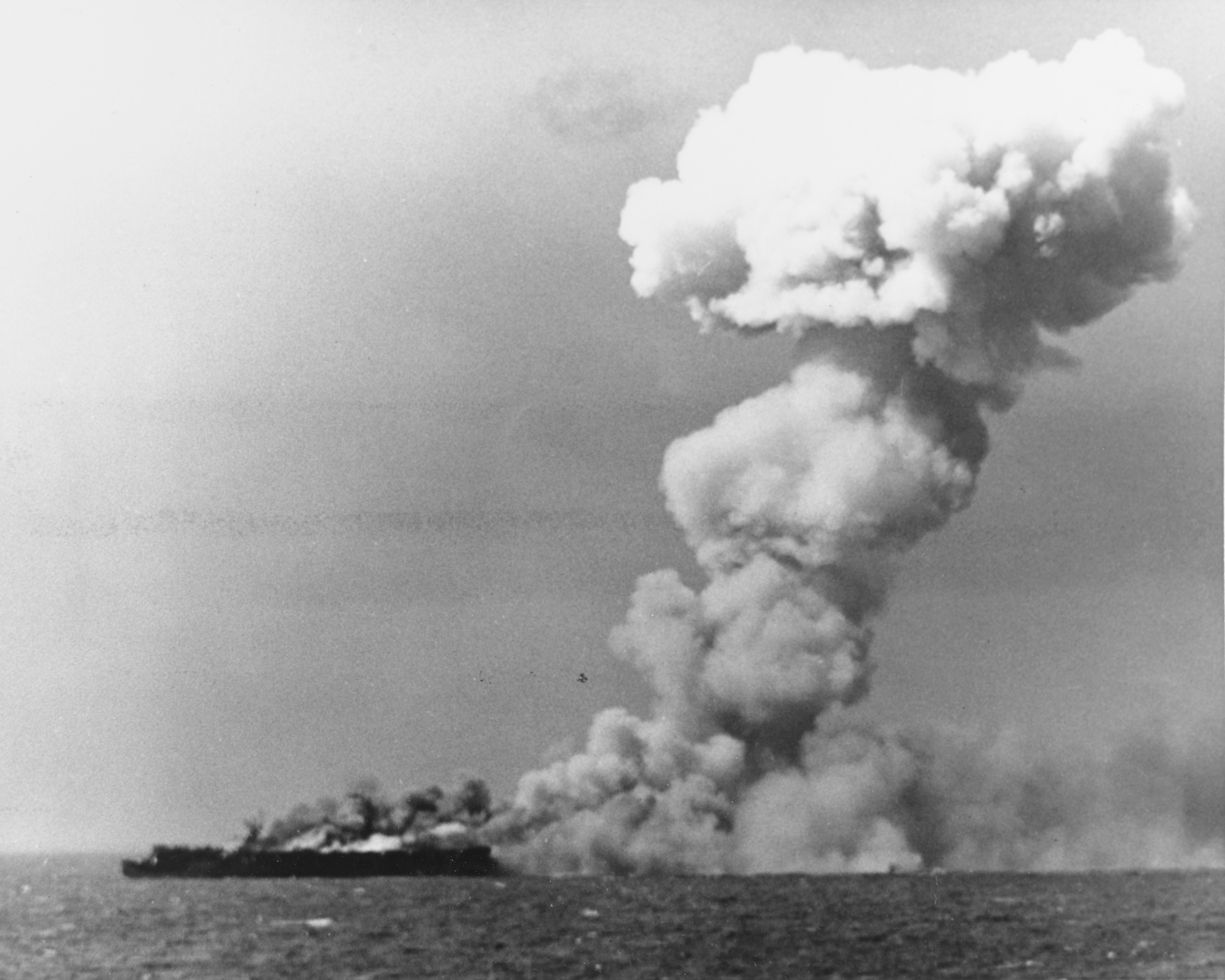
Battle of Leyte Gulf between United States and Japan, October 23, 1944.

- October 2 – WWII:
  - Nazi troops end the Warsaw Uprising. Home Army commander Tadeusz Bór-Komorowski signs the act of capitulation. This is followed by the Destruction of Warsaw.
  - Battle of the Scheldt begins.
- October 4 – WWII: Milan Nedić's collaborationist puppet government of the Axis powers, the Government of National Salvation in Nazi-occupied Serbia, is disbanded.
- October 5 – WWII: Royal Canadian Air Force pilots from 401 Squadron shoot down the first German Me 262 over the Netherlands.
- October 6
  - WWII: The Battle of Debrecen starts on the Eastern Front, lasting until October 29.
  - Milan Nedić, president of the Serbian collaborationist puppet state of the Axis powers, the Government of National Salvation, flees from Belgrade in Nazi-occupied Serbia by air together with other Serbian collaborators and German officials, via Hungary to Austria.
  - The Dumbarton Oaks Conference concludes.
- October 7 – The Holocaust: Members of the Sonderkommando – a special detachment of Jewish prisoners who are forced to empty the gas chambers after a mass gassing and undertake the burning of the bodies – organises the only armed revolt that ever takes place in Auschwitz concentration camp. They succeed in destroying the gas chambers and Crematorium IV. The Waffen-SS murders more than 450 prisoners who take part in the revolt.
- October 8 – The Adventures of Ozzie and Harriet radio show debuts in the United States.
- October 9 – WWII: Fourth Moscow Conference: British Prime Minister Winston Churchill and Soviet Premier Joseph Stalin begin a 9-day conference in Moscow, to discuss the future of Europe.
- October 10
  - The Holocaust/Porajmos: 800 Romani children are systematically murdered at the Auschwitz concentration camp.
  - WWII: 10/10 Air Raid: Allied forces inflict significant losses upon Imperial Japanese Navy ships moored in Naha Harbor, destroying much of the city of Naha, Okinawa as well.
  - WWII: Soviet forces reach the Baltic Sea coast in Lithuania, cutting off German Army Group North and creating the Courland Pocket.
- October 11 – The Tuvan People's Republic is annexed into the Soviet Union.
- October 12
  - WWII: The Germans leave Athens, as the first Allied troops and Greek guerrillas enter the city
    'Athenian Liberty' flag raised, on the Acropolis of Athens on the liberation of the city on 12 October 1944
  - Canadian Arctic explorer Henry Larsen returns to Vancouver, becoming the first person successfully to navigate the Northwest Passage in both directions, in the Royal Canadian Mounted Police schooner St. Roch. His westbound voyage is the first completed in a single season, and the first passage through the Prince of Wales Strait.
- October 13 – WWII:
  - Riga, the capital of Latvia, is taken by the Red Army.
  - The first V-2 rocket attack on Antwerp takes place.
- October 14 – WWII: German Field Marshal Erwin Rommel commits forced suicide rather than face public disgrace and execution for allegedly conspiring against Adolf Hitler.
- October 15–16 – WWII: In Hungary, with the support of German troops, a coup d'état takes place: the fascist government of Ferenc Szálasi comes to power, ordering the troops to continue the fight against the Soviet army.
- October 16 – WWII: American bombing of Salzburg destroys the dome of the city's cathedral and most of a Mozart family home.
- October 18 – WWII: The Volkssturm Nazi militia is founded, on Adolf Hitler's orders.
- October 19 – The Guatemalan Revolution begins with the overthrow of Federico Ponce Vaides by a popular leftist movement.
- October 20 – WWII:
  - Belgrade Offensive ends when Belgrade is liberated by Yugoslav Partisans, together with the Bulgarian Army and the Red Army, and the remnants of Nedić's collaborationist Serbian puppet state, the Government of National Salvation, are abolished.
  - American and Filipino troops (with Filipino guerrillas) begin the Battle of Leyte in the Philippines. American forces land on Red Beach in Palo, Leyte, as General Douglas MacArthur returns to the Philippines with Philippine Commonwealth president Sergio Osmeña and Armed Forces of the Philippines Generals Basilio J. Valdes and Carlos P. Romulo. American forces land on the beaches in Dulag, Leyte, accompanied by Filipino troops entering the town, and fiercely opposed by the Japanese occupation forces. The combined forces liberate Tacloban.
  - Operation Pheasant begins – an offensive in the Netherlands which supports the ongoing Battle of the Scheldt.
- October 21 – WWII: Aachen, the first German city to fall, is captured by American troops.
- October 23–26 – WWII: Naval Battle of Leyte Gulf in the Philippines – In the largest naval battle in history by most criteria and the last naval battle in history between battleships, combined United States and Australian naval forces decisively defeat the Imperial Japanese Navy.
- October 24
  - Battle of Leyte Gulf: The Japanese battleship Musashi is sunk by United States aircraft.
  - The Allies recognise Charles de Gaulle's cabinet as the provisional government of France.
- October 25
  - WWII: The Red Army liberates Kirkenes, the first town in Norway to be liberated.
  - WWII: USS Tang is sunk in the Formosa Strait by one of her own torpedoes. Medal of Honor-winning submarine ace Richard O'Kane becomes a prisoner of war.
  - WWII: Japanese aircraft launch their first organized kamikaze attack on United States ships during the Battle of Leyte Gulf.
  - 76-year-old American amateur soprano Florence Foster Jenkins gives a sell-out public recital in Carnegie Hall, New York. The audience and press are scathing: "she can sing everything except notes". 5 days later she suffers a fatal heart attack, dying at home on November 26.
- October 27 – WWII: German forces capture Banská Bystrica, the center of anti-Nazi opposition in Slovakia, bringing the Slovak National Uprising to an end.
- October 30
  - The Holocaust: Anne Frank and her sister Margot are deported from Auschwitz to the Bergen-Belsen concentration camp.
  - Appalachian Spring, a ballet by Martha Graham with music by Aaron Copland, debuts at the Library of Congress in Washington, D.C., with Graham in the lead role.
- October 31 – Serial killer Dr Marcel Petiot is apprehended at a Paris Métro station after 7 months on the run.

=== November ===
- November 1–December 7 – Delegates of 52 nations meet at the International Civil Aviation Conference in Chicago, to plan for postwar international cooperation, framing the constitution of the International Civil Aviation Organization.
- November 3 – WWII: Two supreme commanders of the Slovak National Uprising, Generals Ján Golian and Rudolf Viest, are captured, tortured and later executed by German forces.
- November 7
  - 1944 United States presidential election: Franklin D. Roosevelt wins reelection over Republican challenger Thomas E. Dewey, becoming the only U.S. president elected to a fourth term.
  - Election day rail accident in Puerto Rico: A passenger train derails at Aguadilla due to excessive speed on a downgrade; 16 are killed, 50 injured.
- November 8 – WWII: A German surrender of Middelburg, Zeeland, to Allied forces ends the Battle of the Scheldt after five weeks, opening the Belgian port of Antwerp to Allied shipping. The bulk of the fighting has been by Canadians, with over 6,000 casualties.
- November 10 – WWII: Ammunition ship USS Mount Hood disintegrates from the accidental detonation of 3,800 tons of cargo, in the Seeadler Harbor fleet anchorage at Manus Island. 22 small boats are destroyed, 36 nearby ships damaged, 432 men are killed and 371 more are injured.
- November 11 – The 1942–44 musicians' strike ends in the United States when RCA Victor and Columbia Records capitulate to the union's demands.
- November 12 – WWII: Operation Catechism – German battleship Tirpitz is sunk by British Royal Air Force Lancaster bombers near Tromsø in Norway. Estimated casualties range from 950 to 1,204.
- November 14 – WWII: American submarine USS Queenfish torpedoes Japanese aircraft carrier Akitsu Maru in the East China Sea; 2,246 drown.
- November 16
  - WWII: U.S. forces begin the month-long Operation Queen in the Rur Valley.
  - The Jussi Awards, the Finnish film award ceremony, is held for the first time at Restaurant Adlon in Helsinki.
- November 17 – WWII: Partisan troops of the National Liberation Movement enter Tirana, the capital of Albania.
- November 18
  - The Popular Socialist Youth is founded in Cuba.
  - WWII: American submarine USS Picuda torpedoes Japanese landing craft depot ship Mayasan Maru; 3,546 drown.
- November 22
  - Conscription Crisis: Prime Minister of Canada William Mackenzie King agrees a one-time conscription levy in Canada for overseas service.
  - Laurence Olivier's film Henry V, based on Shakespeare's play, opens in London. It is the most acclaimed and the most successful movie version of a Shakespeare play made up to this time, and the first in Technicolor. Olivier both stars and directs.
- November 23 – Alsace campaign: Allied troops liberates city of Strasbourg.
- November 24 – WWII: German forces evacuate from the West Estonian Archipelago.
- November 27
  - RAF Fauld explosion: Between 3,450 and 3,930 tons (3,500 and 4,000 tonnes) of ordnance explodes at an underground storage depot in Staffordshire, England, leaving about 75 dead and a crater 1,200 metres (1,300 yd) across and 120 metres (390 ft) deep. The blast is one of the largest non-nuclear explosions in history, and the largest on UK soil.
  - Operation Tigerfish: Royal Air Force bombing of Freiburg im Breisgau kills 2,800.
- November 29 – WWII: American submarine USS Archerfish sinks Japanese aircraft carrier Shinano, the largest carrier built to this date, and will remain through the twentieth century the largest ship sunk by a submarine.

=== December ===
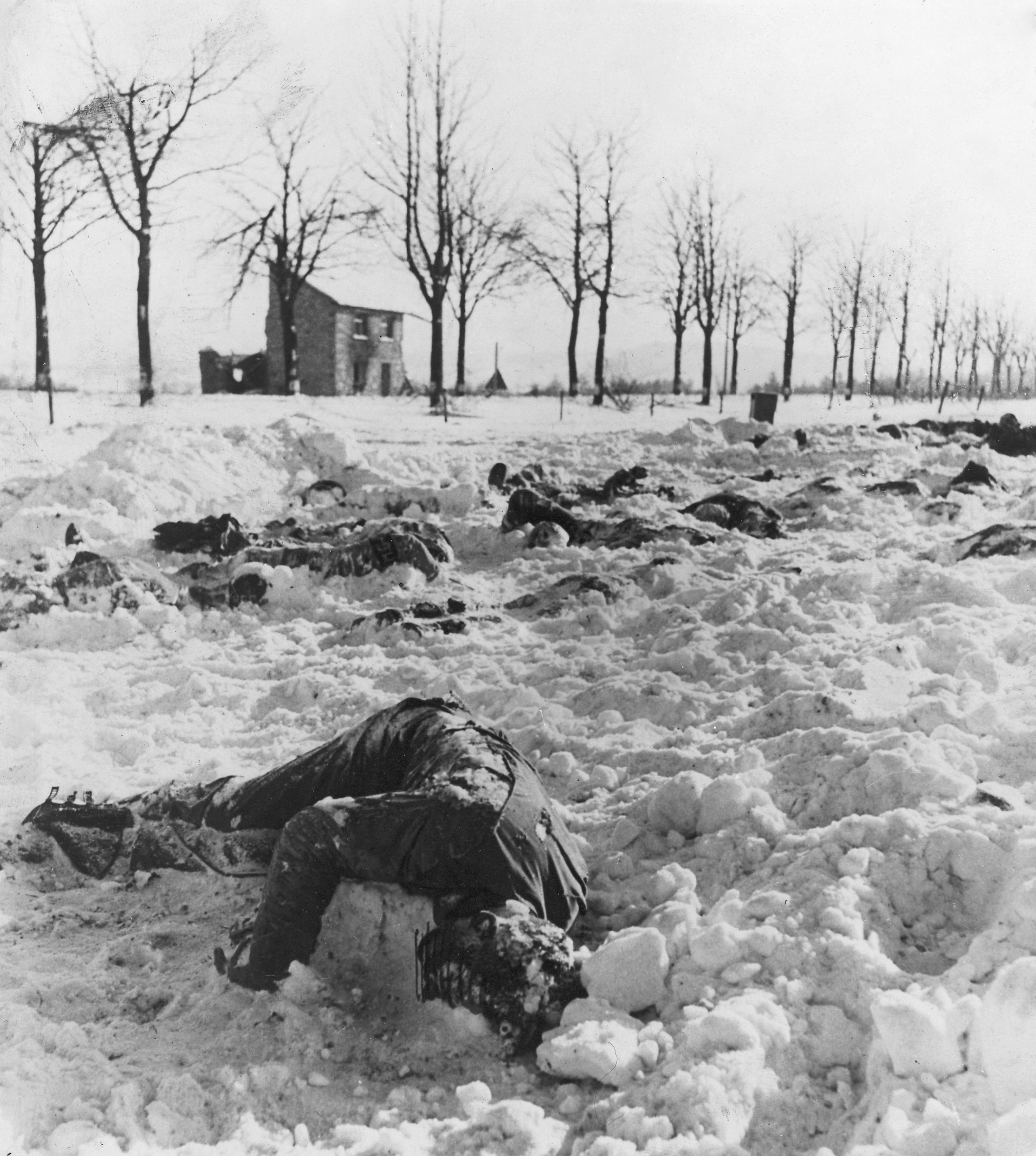
Victims of the Malmedy massacre

- December 1 – Edward Stettinius, Jr. becomes the last United States Secretary of State of the Roosevelt administration, filling the seat left by Cordell Hull.
- December 3 – WWII:
  - Dekemvriana: Fighting breaks out between Communists and royalists in newly liberated Greece, eventually leading to a full-scale Greek Civil War.
  - The Home Guard (United Kingdom) is stood down.
- December 7
  - The Convention on International Civil Aviation is signed in Chicago, creating the International Civil Aviation Organization.
  - The Arab Women's Congress of 1944 is hosted by the Egyptian Feminist Union in Cairo, leading to establishment of the Arab Feminist Union.
  - 1944 Tōnankai earthquake: An earthquake along the coast of Wakayama Prefecture in Japan causes a tsunami which kills 1223 people.
- December 10 – Italian conductor Arturo Toscanini leads a concert performance of the first half of Beethoven's Fidelio (minus its spoken dialogue) on NBC Radio, starring Rose Bampton. He chooses this opera for its political message: a statement against tyranny and dictatorship. Presenting it in German, Toscanini intends it as a tribute to the German people who are being oppressed by Hitler. The second half is broadcast a week later. The performance is later released on LP and CD, the first of 7 operas that Toscanini conducts on radio.
- December 12–13 – WWII: British units attempt to take the Italian hilltop town of Tossignano, but are repulsed.
- December 13 – WWII:
  - Battle of Mindoro – United States, Australian and Philippine Commonwealth troops land on Mindoro Island in the Philippines.
  - Battle of Metz – After three months of fighting, American troops led by General George S. Patton liberate the city of Metz.
- December 14
  - The Soviet government changes Turkish place names to Russian in Crimea.
  - The film National Velvet is released in the United States, bringing a young Elizabeth Taylor to stardom.
- December 15 – A USAAF utility aircraft carrying bandleader Major Glenn Miller disappears in heavy fog over the English Channel, while flying to Paris.
- December 16 – WWII:
  - Germany begins the Ardennes offensive, later known as the Battle of the Bulge.
  - Cinema Rex bombing: a German V-2 rocket (fired from the Netherlands) lands directly on a cinema in Antwerp (Allied-occupied Belgium), killing 567 people including 296 U.S. servicemen and up to 74 children, the single highest death total from a single rocket attack during the war.
  - General George C. Marshall becomes the first U.S. Five-Star General.
- December 17 – WWII:
  - Malmedy massacre: German SS troops under Joachim Peiper machine gun American prisoners of war captured during the Battle of the Bulge near Malmedy, and elsewhere in Belgium.
  - Bombing of Ulm: 707 people are killed and 25,000 left homeless.
- December 18 – General Douglas MacArthur becomes the second U.S. Five-Star General.
- December 19 – The daily newspaper Le Monde begins publication in Paris.
- December 20
  - The United States Women Airforce Service Pilots are disbanded.
  - General Dwight D. Eisenhower is promoted to the rank of U.S. Five-Star General.
- December 22
  - WWII: Brigadier General Anthony C. McAuliffe, commander of the U.S. forces defending Bastogne, refuses to accept demands for surrender by sending a one-word reply, "Nuts!", to the German command.
  - The Vietnam People's Army is formed in French Indochina.
- December 24
  - WWII: Troopship SS Léopoldville is sunk in the English Channel by German submarine U-486. Approximately 763 soldiers of the U.S. 66th Infantry Division, bound for the Battle of the Bulge, drown.
  - WWII: German tanks reach the furthest point of the Bulge at Celles.
  - WWII: Fifty German V-1 flying bombs, air-launched from Heinkel He 111 bombers flying over the North Sea, target Manchester in England, killing 42 and injuring more than 100 in the Oldham area.
  - WWII: Bande massacre: 34 men between the ages of 17 and 32 are executed by the Sicherheitsdienst near Bande, Belgium, in retaliation for the killing of 3 German soldiers.
  - The first complete U.S. production of Tchaikovsky's ballet The Nutcracker is presented in San Francisco, choreographed by Willam Christensen. It will become an annual tradition there, and for the next ten years, the San Francisco Ballet will be the only company in the United States performing the complete work.
- December 24–26 – Agana race riot in Guam between white and black United States Marines.
- December 26
  - WWII: American troops repulse German forces at Bastogne.
  - The original stage version of The Glass Menagerie by Tennessee Williams premieres in Chicago.
  - Esztergom, Hungary, is captured by Soviet forces, beginning the Siege of Budapest.
- December 30
  - King George II of Greece declares a regency, leaving his throne vacant.
  - Stage Door Cartoon is the first cartoon produced by Eddie Selzer.
- December 31 – WWII: Battle of Leyte – Tens of thousands of Imperial Japanese Army soldiers are killed in action, in a significant Filipino/Allied military victory.

=== Date unknown ===
- The 1944 Summer Olympics, scheduled for London (together with the February Winter Olympics scheduled for Cortina d'Ampezzo in Italy), are suspended due to WWII.
- The National Committee for Education on Alcoholism, predecessor of the National Council on Alcoholism and Drug Dependence, is established in the United States by Marty Mann.
- Last known evidence of the existence of the Asiatic lion in the wild in Khuzestan Province, Persia.
- The BC Žalgiris professional basketball club is founded in Kaunas, Lithuanian Soviet Socialist Republic.

== Births ==
=== January ===
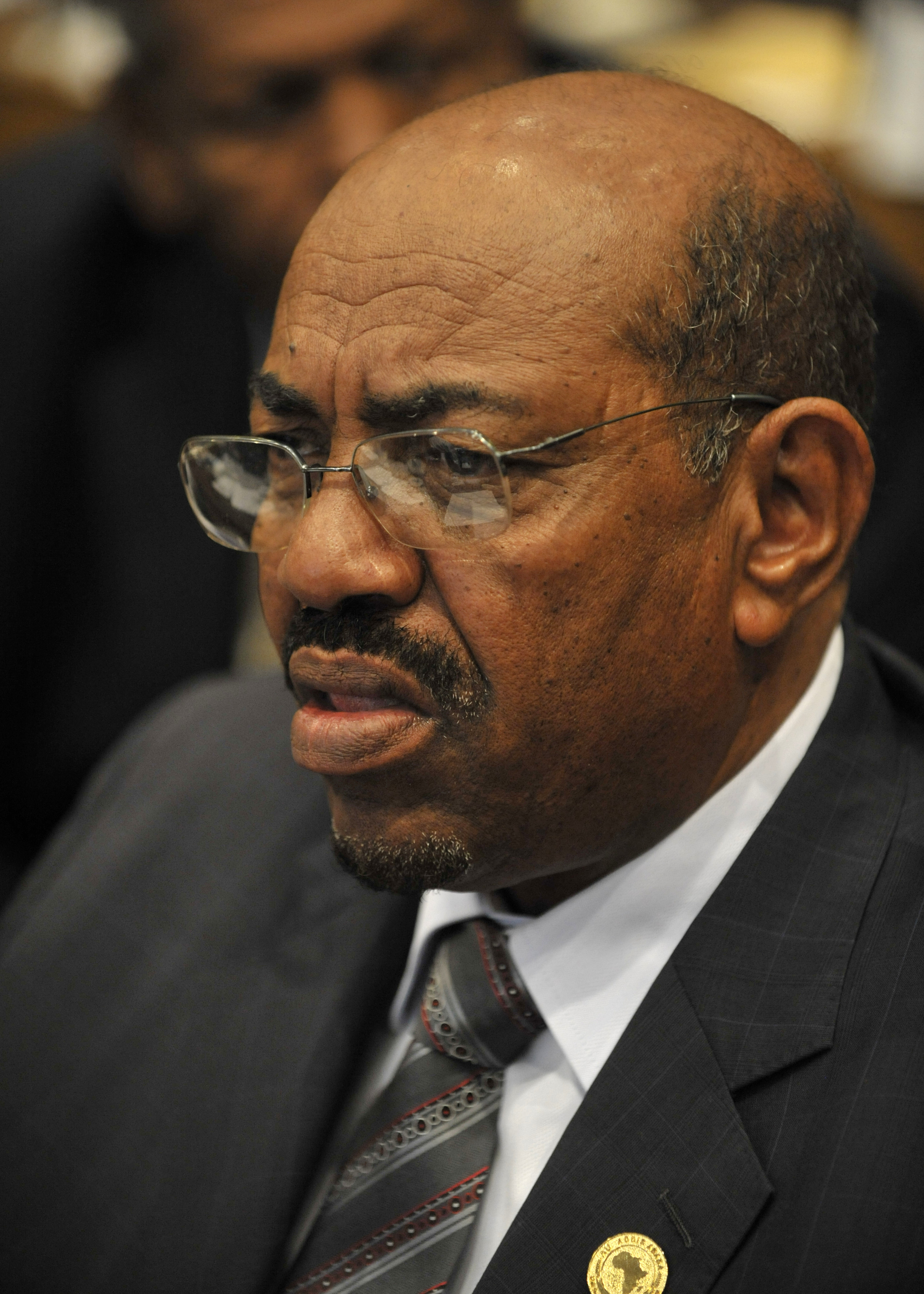
Omar al-Bashir

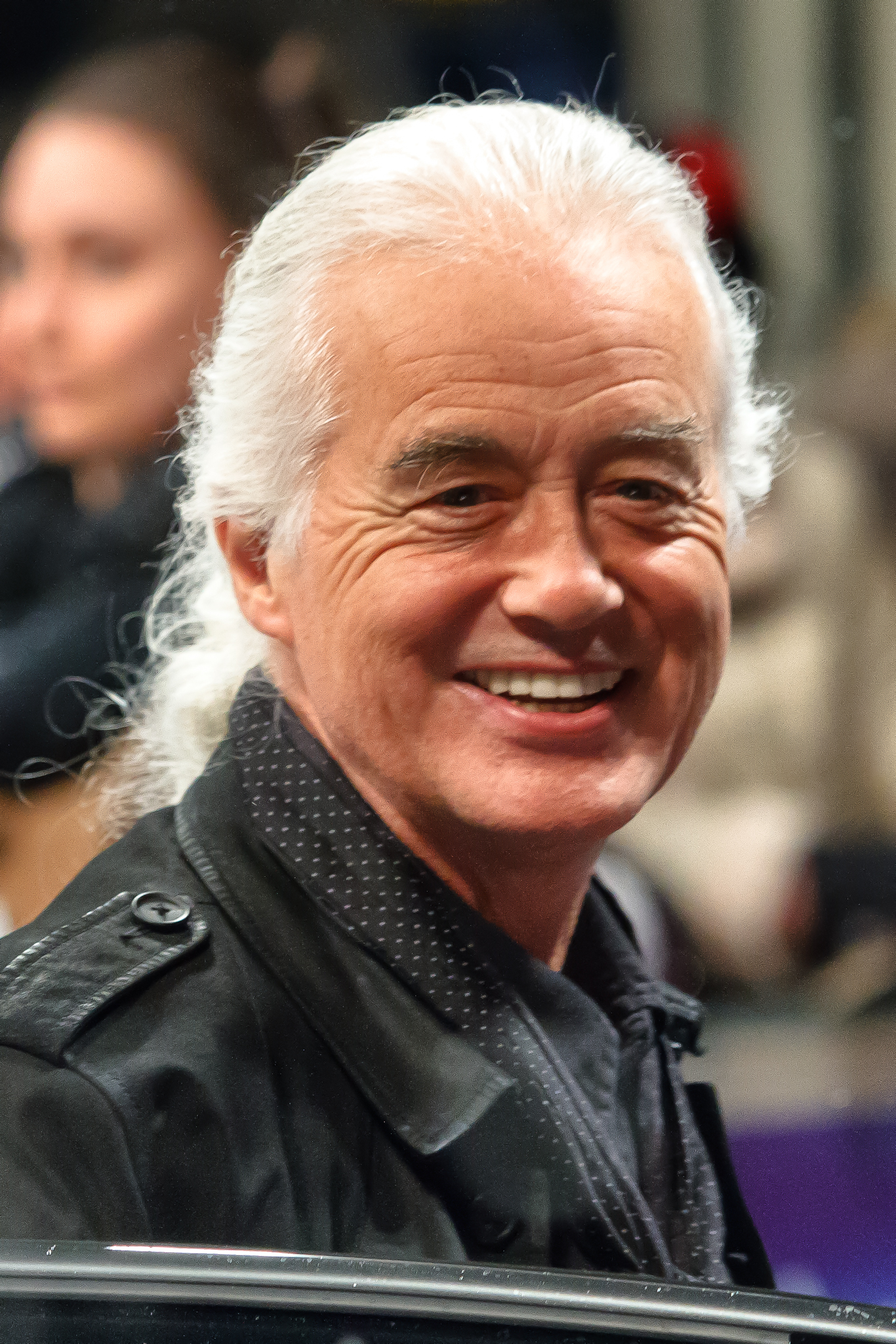
Jimmy Page

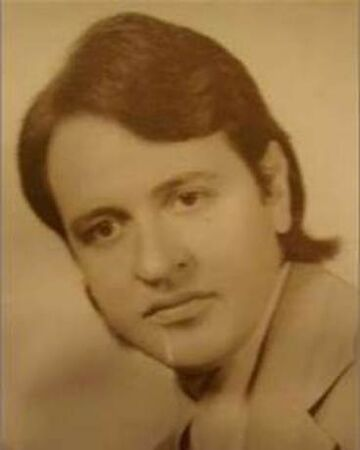
Carlos Villagrán

Paul Keating

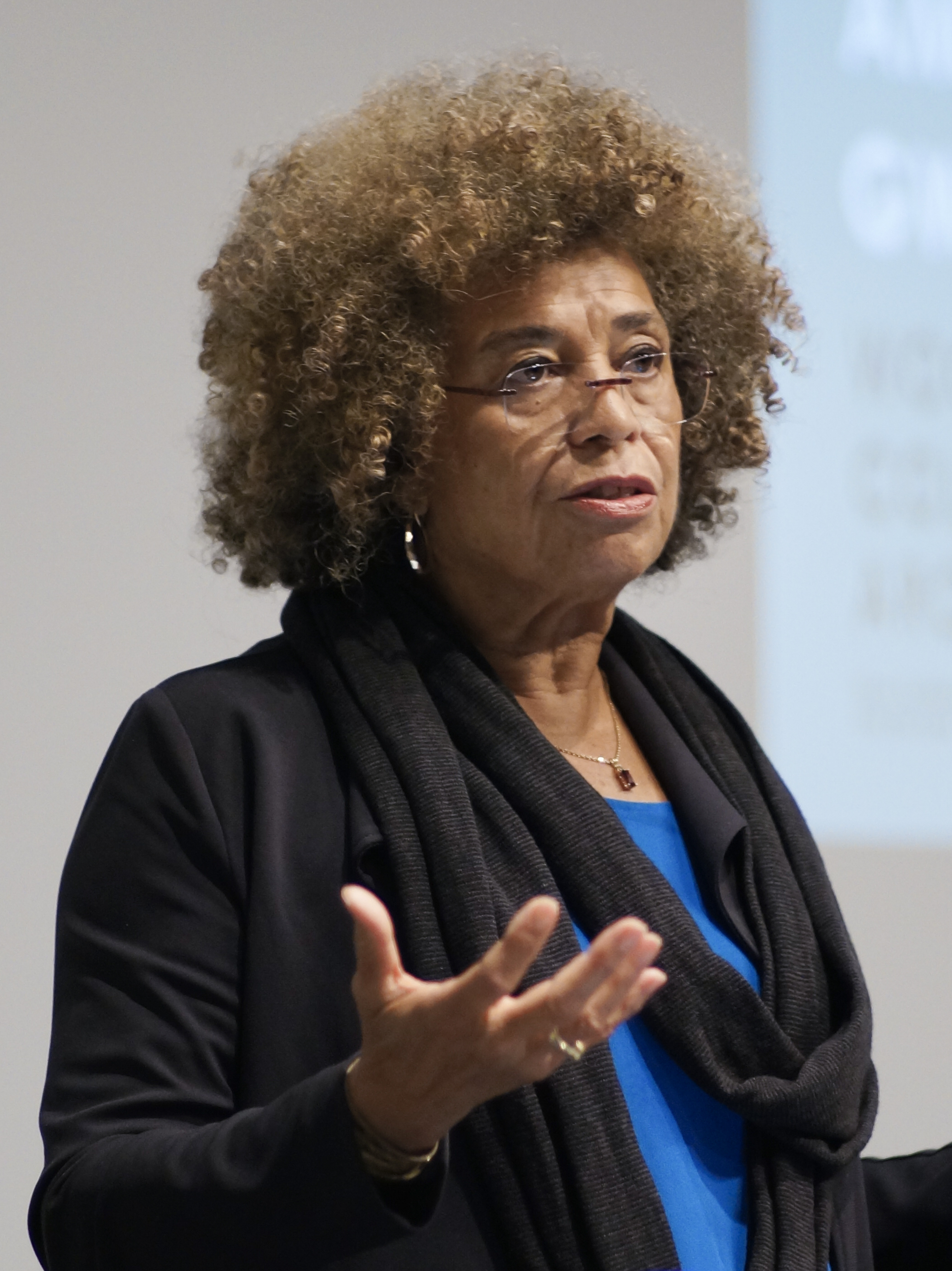
Angela Davis

- January 1
  - Omar al-Bashir, 7th President of Sudan
  - Mohammad Abdul Hamid, President of Bangladesh
  - Jumabek Ibraimov, 5th Prime Minister of Kyrgyzstan (d. 1999)
  - Zafarullah Khan Jamali, Pakistani politician, 15th Prime Minister of Pakistan (d. 2020)
  - Robert Lee Minor, American actor, stunt performer
  - Muhammad Naji al-Otari, Syrian politician, 41st Prime Minister of Syria
- January 2
  - Prince Norodom Ranariddh, Cambodian politician (d. 2021)
  - Lowell M. Snow, General authority of the Church of Jesus Christ of Latter-day Saints (LDS Church)
  - Willy Dobbe, Dutch television presenter and announcer
- January 3
  - Chris von Saltza, American swimmer
  - Raewyn Connell, Australian sociologist and professor
- January 4
  - Frank Alesia, American actor and television director (d. 2011)
  - Charlie Manuel, American baseball player and manager
  - Angela Harris, Baroness Harris of Richmond, British politician
- January 5 – Carolyn McCarthy, American nurse and politician (d. 2025)
- January 6
  - Bonnie Franklin, American actress, singer, dancer and television director (d. 2013)
  - Rolf M. Zinkernagel, Swiss immunologist, recipient of the Nobel Prize in Physiology or Medicine
- January 7 – Mike Hebert, American volleyball coach (d. 2019)
- January 8
  - Terry Brooks, American fantasy fiction writer
  - Joan Lefkow, senior United States district judge of the United States District Court for the Northern District of Illinois
- January 9
  - Harun Farocki, German filmmaker, author and lecturer (d. 2014)
  - Ian Hornak, American painter, draughtsman and sculptor (d. 2002)
  - Jimmy Page, English rock guitarist (Led Zeppelin)
- January 10
  - Rory Byrne, South African engineer and car designer
  - William Sanderson, American actor
  - Frank Sinatra Jr., American singer-songwriter and actor (d. 2016)
- January 11 – Jim McAndrew, American baseball player (d. 2024)
- January 12
  - Joe Frazier, African-American boxer (d. 2011)
  - Vlastimil Hort, Czechoslovak-born German chess Grandmaster
  - Carlos Villagrán, Mexican actor and comedian
  - Klaus Wedemeier, German politician
- January 13 – Chris von Saltza, American swimmer
- January 17
  - Jan Guillou, Swedish author
  - Françoise Hardy, French singer (d. 2024)
- January 18
  - Paul Keating, 24th Prime Minister of Australia
  - Alexander Van der Bellen, President of Austria
- January 19
  - Shelley Fabares, American actress, singer
  - Dan Reeves, American football player and coach (d. 2022)
- January 20
  - Isao Okano, Japanese judoka
  - Chuck Domanico, American jazz bassist (d. 2002)
- January 23
  - Sergei Belov, Soviet basketball player (d. 2013)
  - Rutger Hauer, Dutch actor, writer and environmentalist (d. 2019)
- January 24
  - David Gerrold, American screenwriter and novelist
  - Klaus Nomi, German singer (d. 1983)
- January 25
  - Sally Beauman, English journalist and novelist (d. 2016)
  - Evan Chandler, American screenwriter and dentist (suicide 2009)
- January 26
  - Angela Davis, African-American political activist, academic and author
  - Jerry Sandusky, American child molester, Penn State football coach
- January 27
  - Peter Akinola, Nigerian religious leader
  - Mairead Maguire, Northern Irish peace activist, recipient of the Nobel Peace Prize
  - Nick Mason, English rock drummer (Pink Floyd)
  - Sam Smith, American basketball player (d. 2022)
- January 28
  - Susan Howard, American actress
  - Rosalía Mera, Spanish fashion retailer (Zara) (d. 2013)
  - John Tavener, English composer (d. 2013)
- January 29 – Susana Giménez, Argentinian television presenter

=== February ===
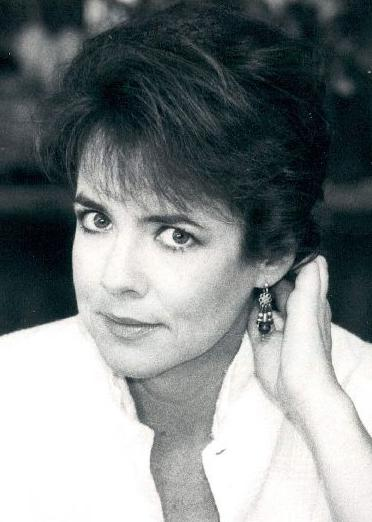
Stockard Channing

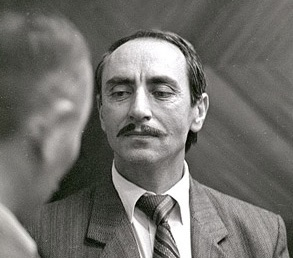
Dzhokhar Dudayev

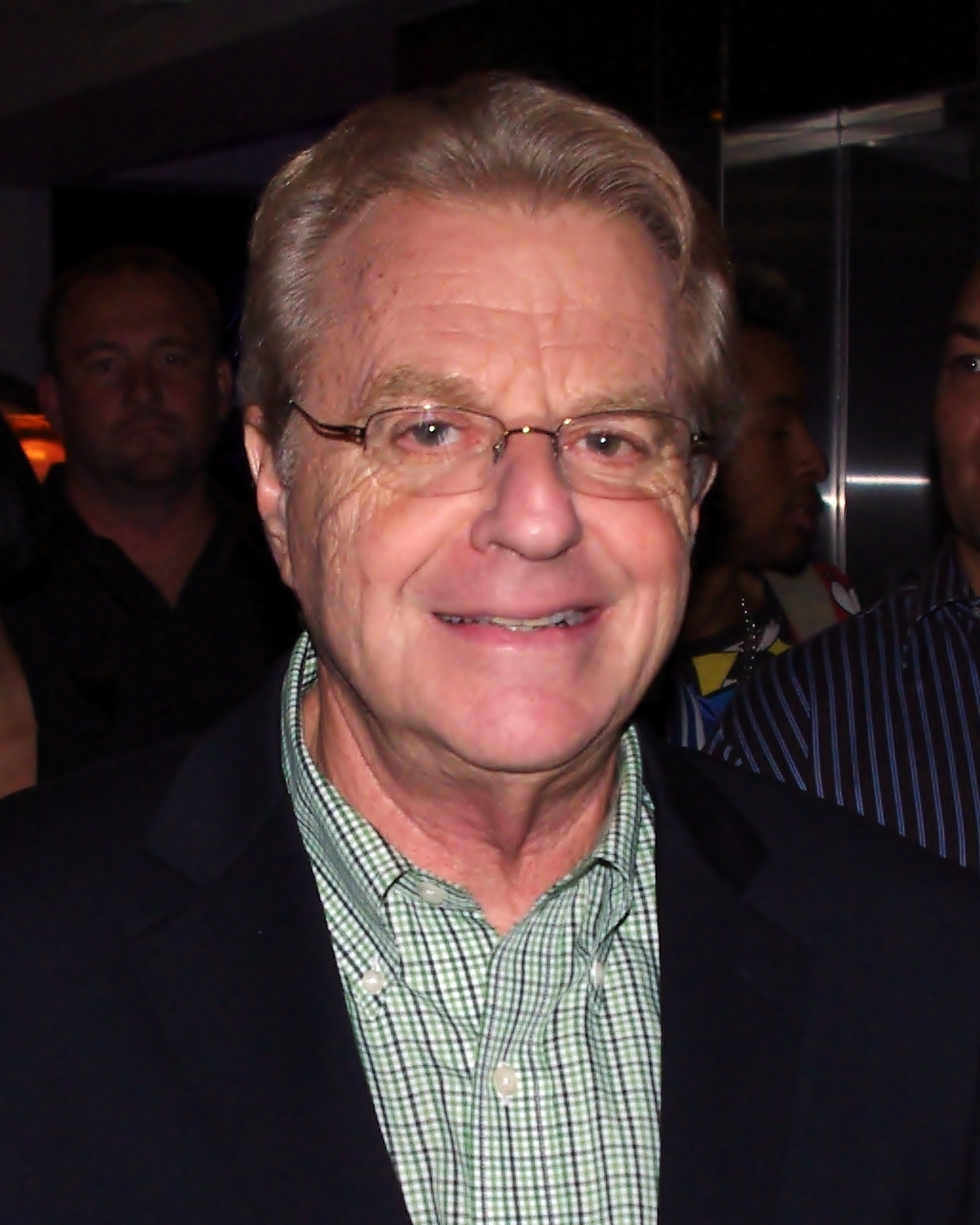
Jerry Springer

- February 1
  - Paul Blair, American baseball player (d. 2013)
  - Mike Enzi, American politician (d. 2021)
- February 2
  - Andrew Davis, English conductor (d. 2024)
  - Geoffrey Hughes, English actor (d. 2012)
  - Oqil Oqilov, Tajikistani politician, 7th Prime Minister of Tajikistan
- February 3 – Wayne Comer, American baseball player (d. 2023)
- February 4
  - Punch Gunalan, Malaysian badminton star (d. 2012)
  - Maruja Carrasco, Spanish botanist and academic (d. 2018)
- February 5
  - Al Kooper, American rock musician (Blood, Sweat & Tears)
  - Thekla Carola Wied, German actress
- February 8
  - Bunky Henry, American professional golfer (d. 2018)
  - Roger Lloyd-Pack, English actor (d. 2014)
  - Tony Minson, British virologist and academic
- February 9 – Alice Walker, African-American novelist, writer, poet and activist
- February 10
  - Peter Allen, Australian-born Academy Award-winning composer and lyricist (d. 1992)
  - Jean-Daniel Cadinot, French photographer, director and producer (d. 2008)
  - Clifford T. Ward, English singer-songwriter (d. 2001)
- February 11 – Michael G. Oxley, American politician (d. 2016)
- February 12
  - Moe Bandy, American country music singer
  - Claudia Mori, Italian producer, actress and singer
- February 13
  - Stockard Channing, American actress
  - Michael Ensign, American actor
  - Jerry Springer, English-born American politician and television personality (d. 2023)
  - Sal Bando, American baseball player and manager (d. 2023)
  - Sheldon Silver, American politician, attorney and convicted felon (d. 2022)
- February 14
  - Carl Bernstein, American journalist
  - Marie-Denise Fabien Jean-Louis, Haitian physician and politician
  - Sir Alan Parker, English film director, producer, actor and writer (d. 2020)
  - Hong Shin-seon, Korean poet
- February 15
  - Mick Avory, English rock drummer (The Kinks)
  - Dzhokhar Dudayev, Chechen leader, first President of the Chechen Republic of Ichkeria (d. 1996)
  - Rommy Hunt Revson, singer and inventor (d. 2022)
  - Aleksandr Serebrov, Soviet cosmonaut (d. 2013)
  - Nusli Wadia, Indian billionaire businessman and the chairman of the Wadia Group
- February 16
  - Richard Ford, American fiction writer
  - António Mascarenhas Monteiro, President of Cape Verde (d. 2016)
  - Quraish Shihab, Indonesian Muslim scholar
- February 17
  - Karl Jenkins, Welsh composer
  - Bernie Grant, British Labour Party MP (d. 2000)
- February 19 – Donald F. Glut, American writer, film director and screenwriter
- February 20
  - Abdul Hamid Zainal Abidin, Malaysian politician and diplomat (d. 2014)
  - Willem van Hanegem, Dutch footballer and coach
- February 22
  - Jonathan Demme, American film director, producer and writer (d. 2017)
  - Tom Okker, Dutch tennis player
  - Christopher Meyer, British diplomat (d. 2022 in France)
  - Robert Kardashian, American attorney and businessman (d. 2003)
  - Tucker Smallwood, American actor, author, and vocalist
- February 23
  - Johnny Winter, American rock musician (d. 2014)
  - Bernard Cornwell, British-American historical novelist
- February 24
  - Ivica Račan, Croatian politician (d. 2007)
  - David J. Wineland, American Nobel-laureate physicist
  - Nicky Hopkins, English rock keyboardist (d. 1994 in the United States)
- February 25 – François Cevert, French racing driver (d. 1973)
- February 27
  - Ken Grimwood, American fantasy fiction writer (d. 2003)
  - Roger Scruton, English philosopher and writer (d. 2020)
- February 28
  - Fanny Cano, Mexican actress and producer (d. 1983)
  - Sepp Maier, German footballer
  - Kelly Bishop, American actress and dancer
- February 29
  - Dennis Farina, American actor (d. 2013)
  - Phyllis Frelich, American deaf actress (d. 2014)

=== March ===
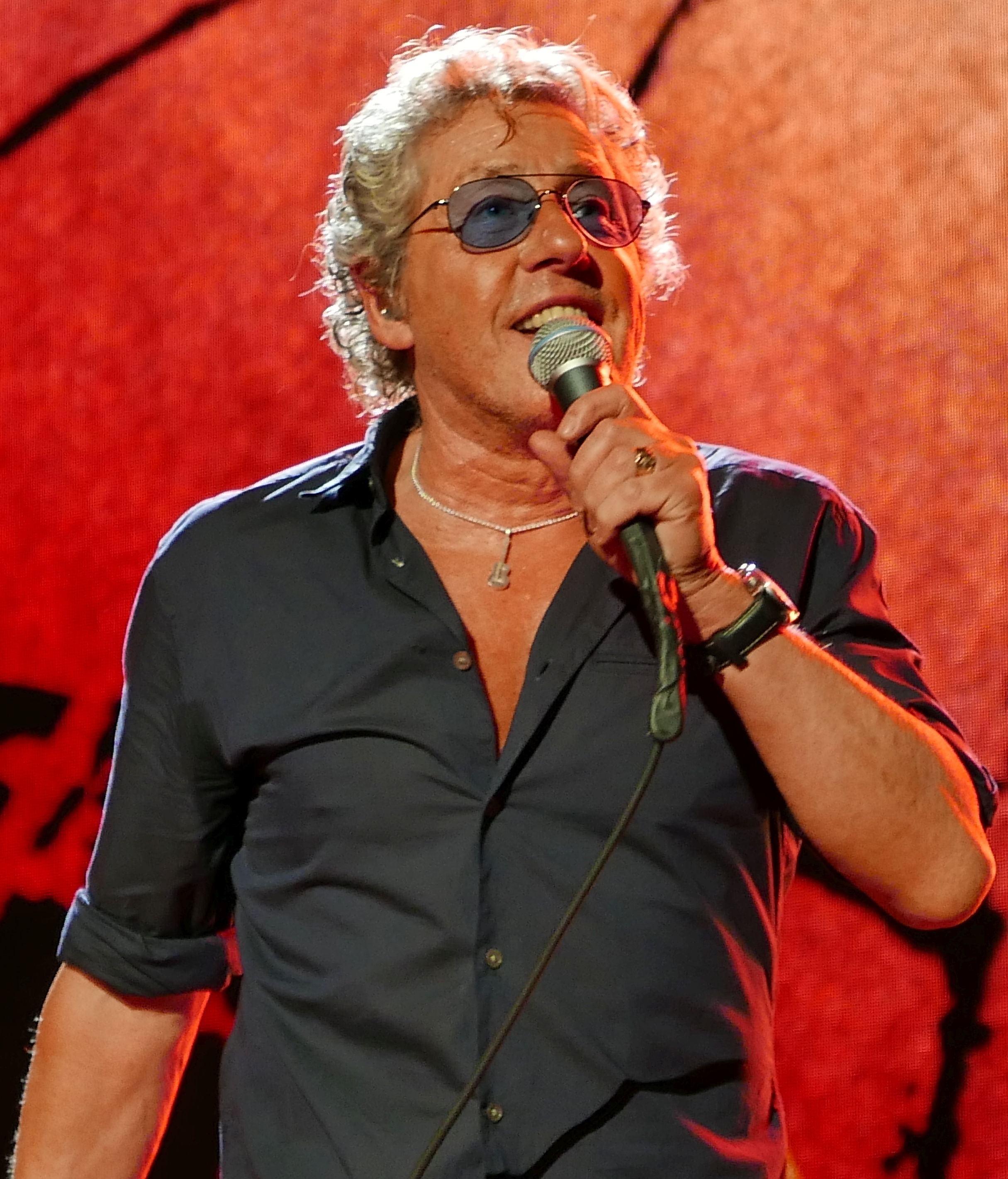
Roger Daltrey

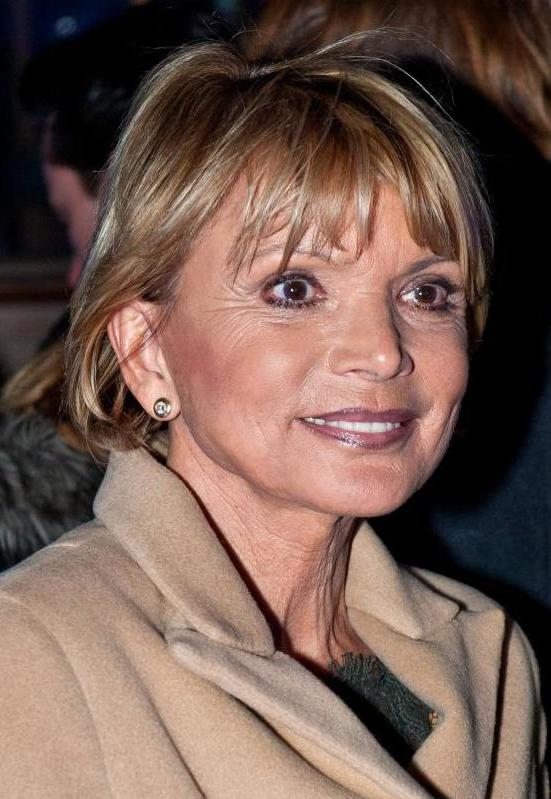
Uschi Glas

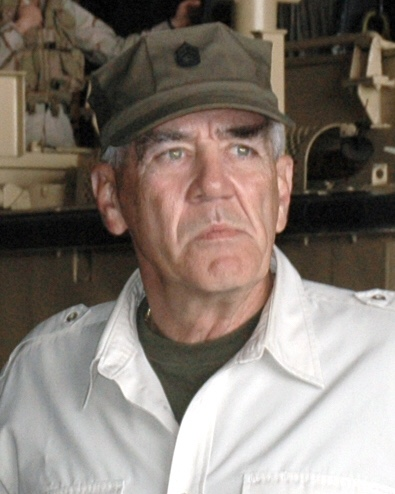
R. Lee Ermey

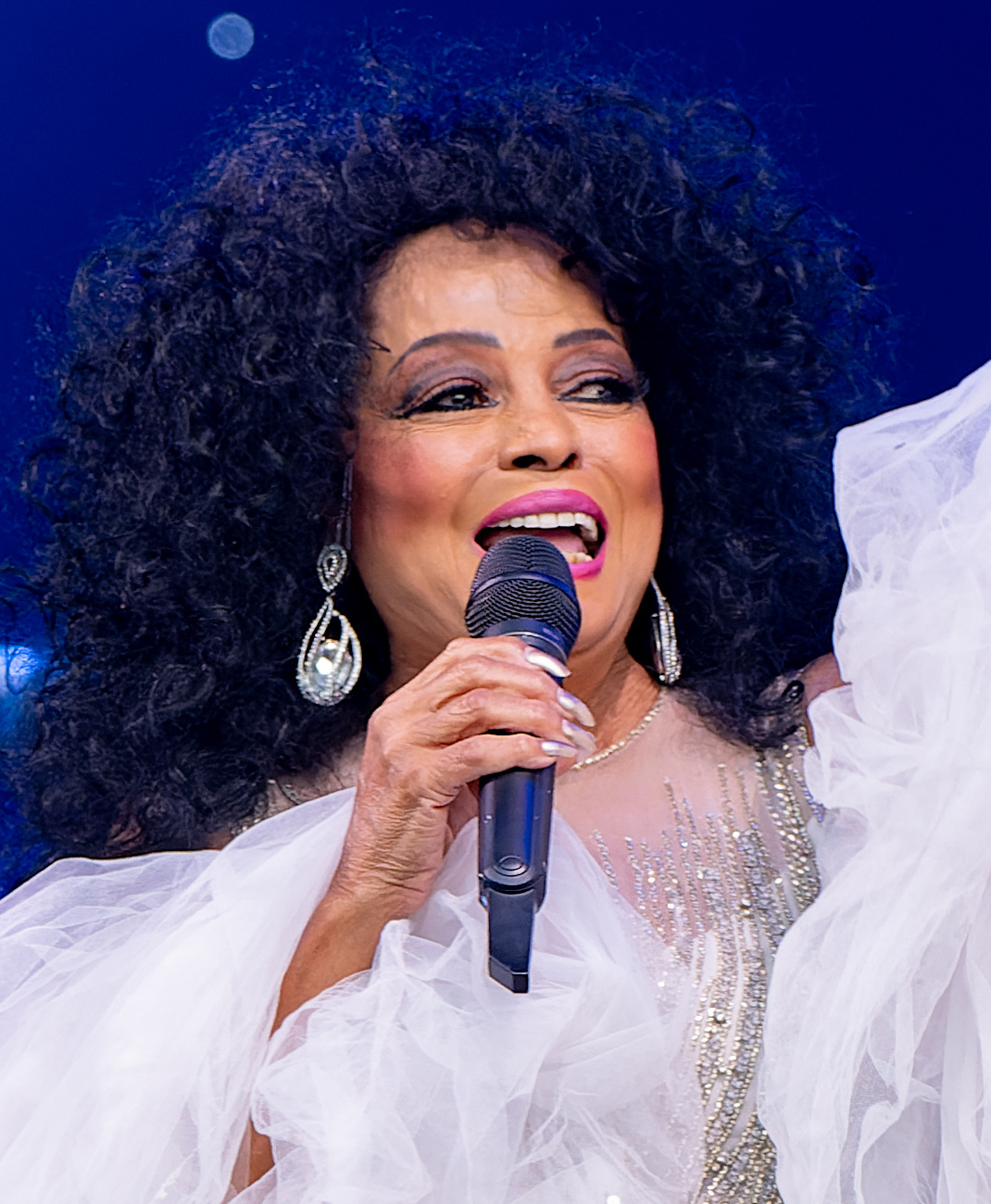
Diana Ross

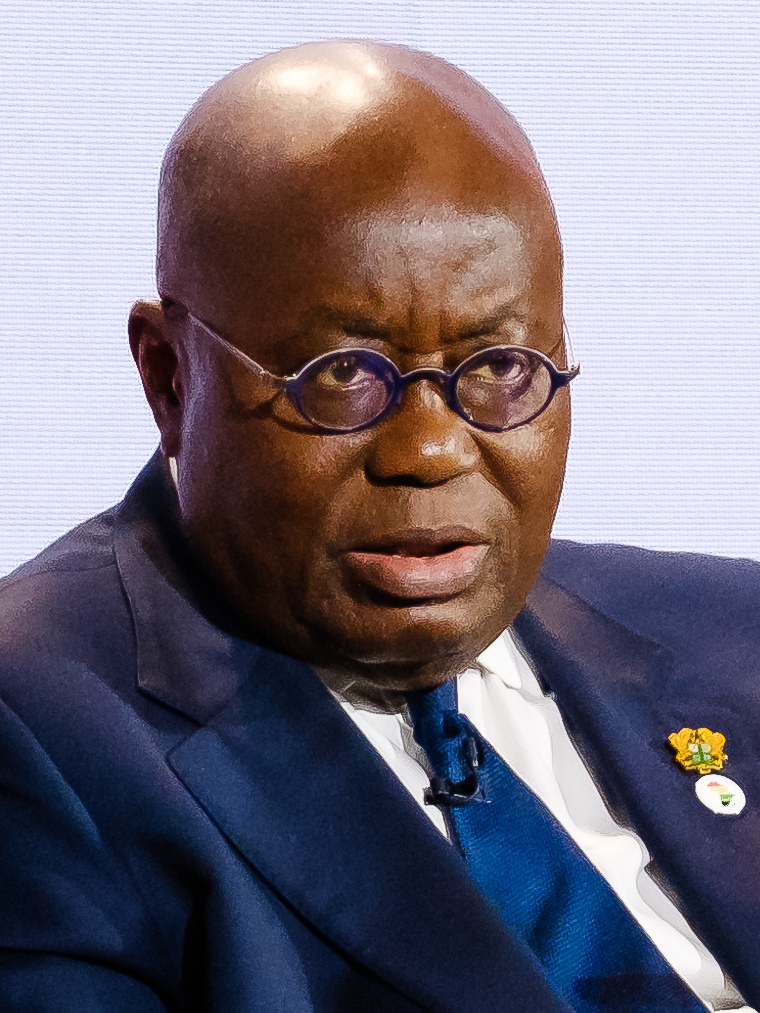
Nana Akufo-Addo

- March 1
  - John Breaux, American politician
  - Roger Daltrey, English singer-songwriter (The Who), actor
- March 2
  - Uschi Glas, German actress
  - Leif Segerstam, Finnish conductor and composer (d. 2024)
- March 3
  - Odessa Cleveland, American actress (M*A*S*H)
  - Chen Chieh-ju, Taiwanese disability rights activist and politician
- March 4
  - Harvey Postlethwaite, English engineer and race car designer (d. 1999)
  - Bobby Womack, African-American singer and songwriter (d. 2014)
- March 5 – Peter Brandes, Danish artist
- March 6
  - Dame Kiri Te Kanawa, New Zealand soprano
  - Mary Wilson, African-American singer (The Supremes) (d. 2021)
- March 7
  - Michael Rosbash, American geneticist and chronobiologist, recipient of the Nobel Prize in Physiology or Medicine
  - Townes Van Zandt, American country singer (d. 1997)
  - Ranulph Fiennes, English adventurer
- March 8
  - Buzz Hargrove, Canadian labour leader
  - Carole Bayer Sager, American lyricist, singer, songwriter, and painter
- March 11
  - Graham Lyle, Grammy-winning Scottish singer-songwriter and guitarist, known for writing several international hits for Tina Turner
  - Don Maclean, English comedian and broadcaster
  - Richard McGeagh, American Olympic swimmer and water polo player (d. 2021)
- March 15
  - Emmerich Danzer, Austrian figure skater
  - Ralph MacDonald, American percussionist, songwriter (d. 2011)
- March 17
  - Pattie Boyd, English model and first wife of George Harrison and Eric Clapton
  - John Sebastian, American singer-songwriter (The Lovin' Spoonful)
- March 18 – Dick Smith, Australian entrepreneur
- March 19
  - Said Musa, Prime Minister of Belize
  - Sirhan Sirhan, Palestinian assassin of Robert F. Kennedy
- March 20
  - Camille Cosby, American television producer and philanthropist
  - Erwin Neher, German biophysicist
- March 21 – Mike Jackson, British Army officer
- March 23
  - Francis Halzen, Belgian-born particle physicist, recipient of the Nobel Prize in Physics
  - Ric Ocasek, American singer-songwriter and record producer (The Cars) (d. 2019)
- March 24 – R. Lee Ermey, American actor and Marine drill instructor (d. 2018)
- March 26 – Diana Ross, African-American actress and singer
- March 27 – Ann Sidney, British actress and Miss World
- March 28
  - Rick Barry, American basketball player
  - Ken Howard, American actor (d. 2016)
- March 29
  - Nana Akufo-Addo, President of Ghana
  - Denny McLain, American baseball player
- March 31 – Angus King, American politician

=== April ===
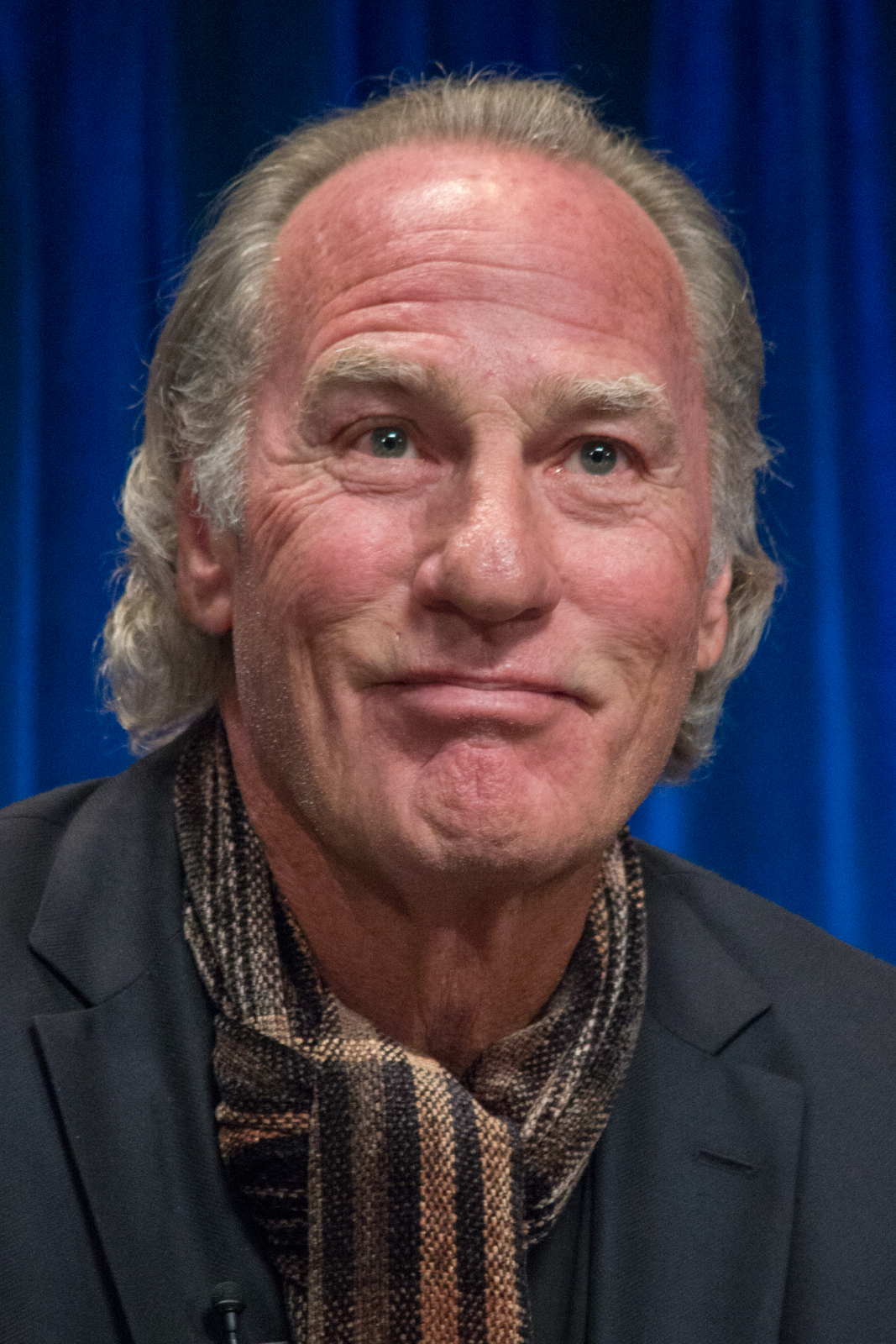
Craig T. Nelson

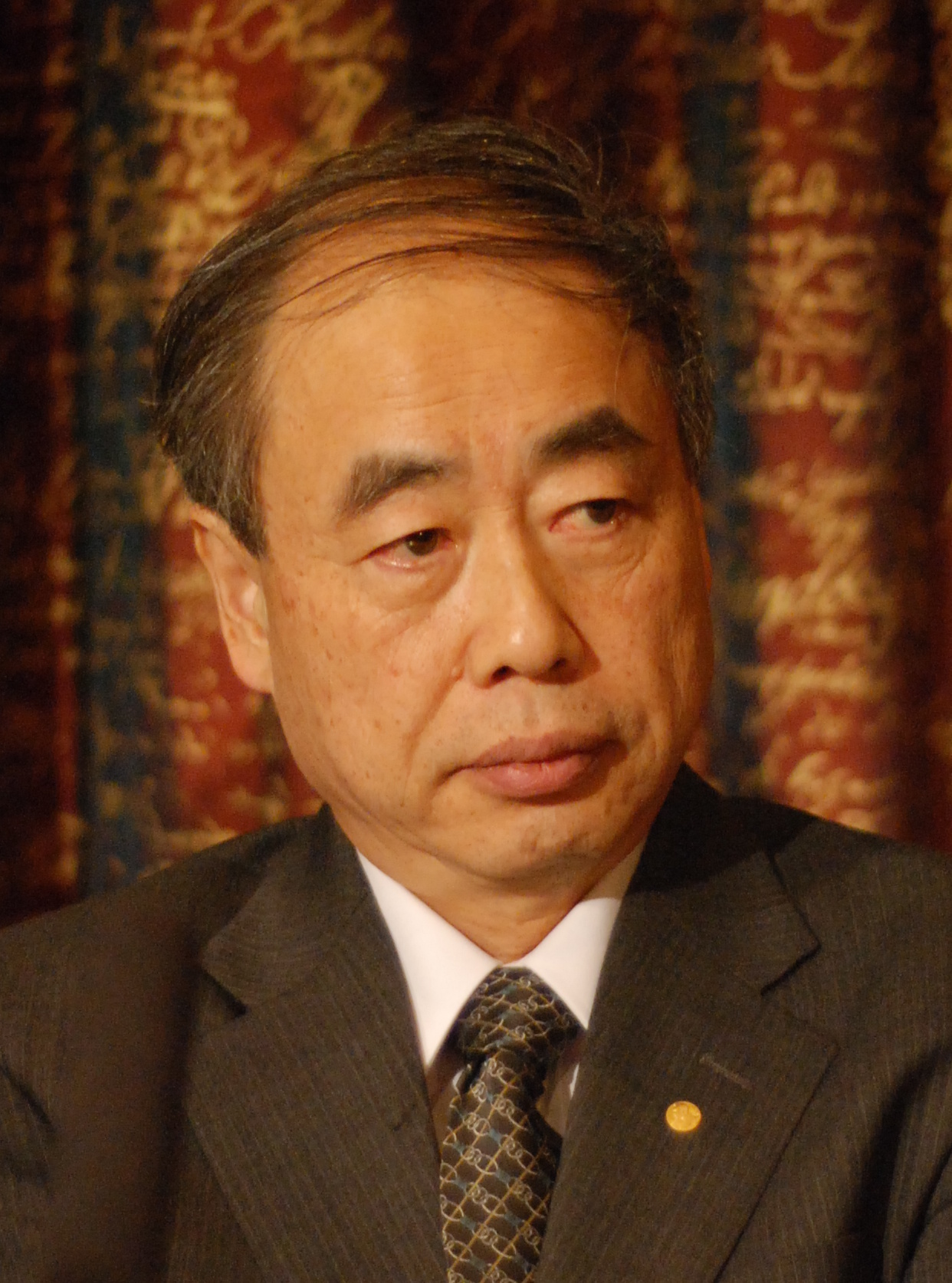
Makoto Kobayashi

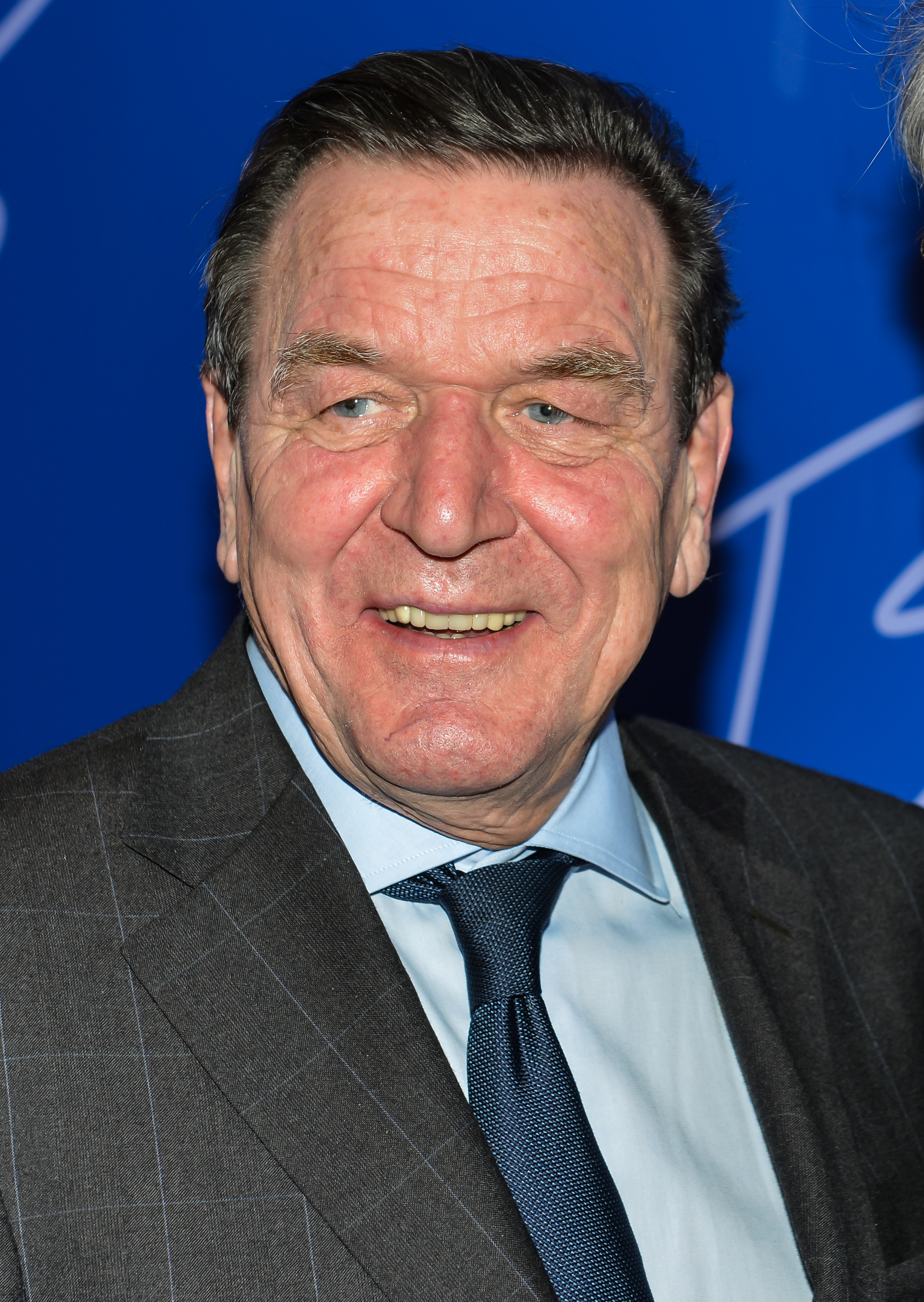
Gerhard Schröder

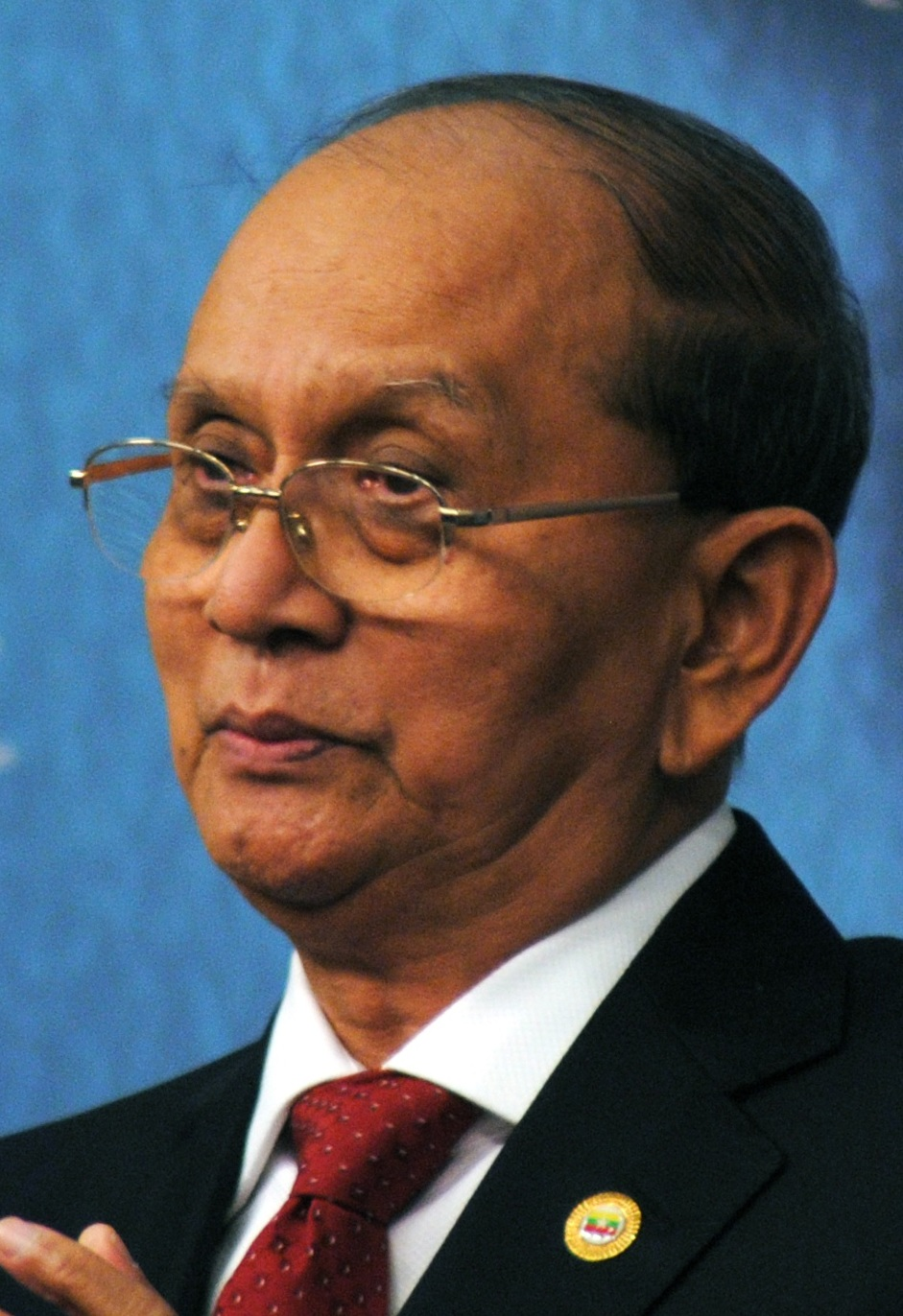
Thein Sein

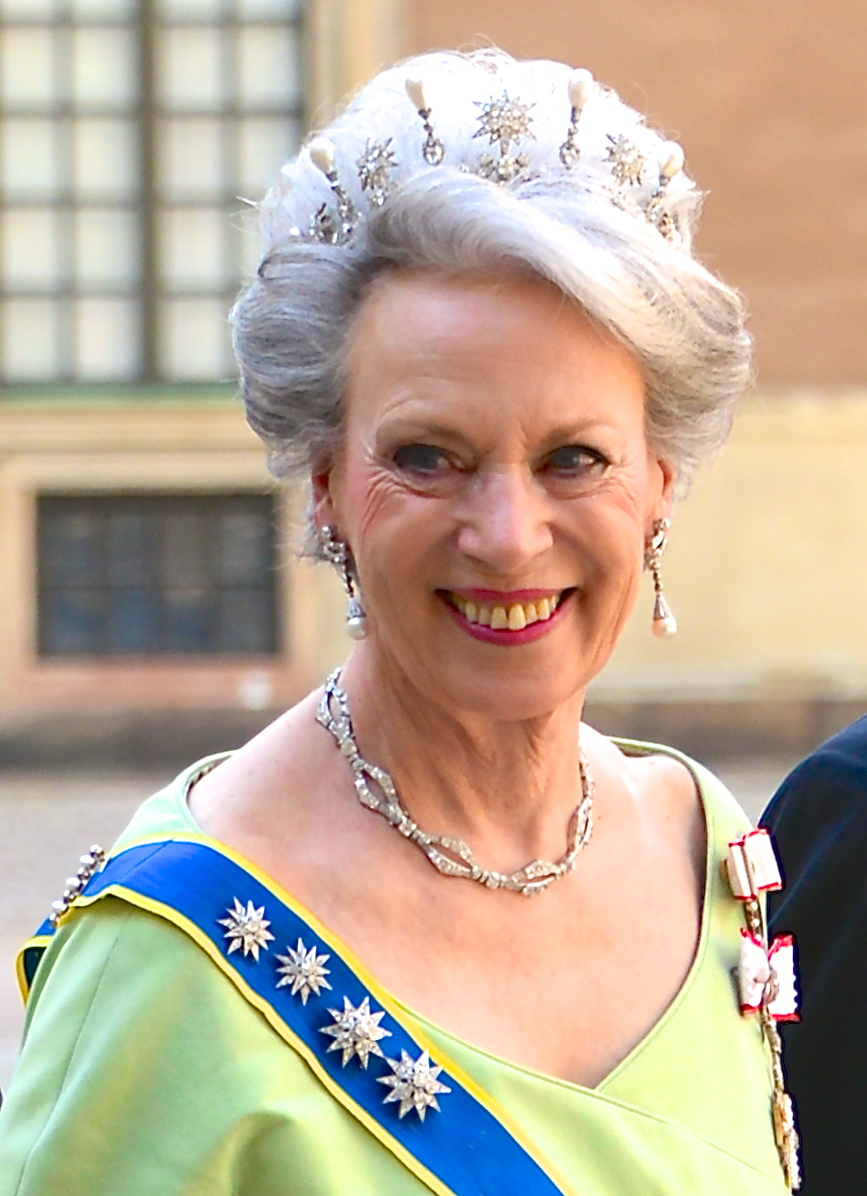
Princess Benedikte of Denmark

- April 1
  - Rusty Staub, American baseball player and coach (d. 2018)
  - Theo Hiddema, Dutch lawyer, media personality and politician
- April 3 – Tony Orlando, American pop singer-songwriter, producer and actor
- April 4
  - Faisal bin Musaid, assassin and nephew of King Faisal of Saudi Arabia (d. 1975)
  - Craig T. Nelson, American actor
  - Phyllida Barlow, British sculptor (d. 2023)
- April 5
  - Peter T. King, American politician
  - Willeke van Ammelrooy, Dutch actress and director
- April 6
  - Judith McConnell, American actress
  - Anita Pallenberg, Italian-born model and actress (d. 2017)
  - Charles Sobhraj, French-Indian serial killer
- April 7
  - Shel Bachrach, American insurance broker, investor, businessman and philanthropist
  - Makoto Kobayashi, Japanese physicist
  - Oshik Levi, Israeli singer and actor
  - Gerhard Schröder, Chancellor of Germany
- April 8
  - Burny Bos, Dutch producer, scenarist and children's book writer.
  - Odd Nerdrum, Norwegian painter
  - Jimmy Walker, American professional basketball player (d. 2007)
- April 11 – John Milius, American film director, producer and screenwriter
- April 12 – Lisa Jardine, historian and polymath (d. 2015)
- April 13
  - Jack Casady, American rock musician (Jefferson Airplane, Hot Tuna)
  - Brian Pendleton, British guitarist (d. 2001)
- April 14 – Nguyễn Phú Trọng, Vietnamese politician, General Secretary of the Communist Party and President (d. 2024)
- April 15
  - Kunishige Kamamoto, Japanese footballer, manager and politician (d. 2025)
  - Dave Edmunds, Welsh singer-songwriter, guitarist and record producer
- April 18
  - Isao Shibata, Japanese baseball player
  - Robert Hanssen, American double agent (d. 2023)
- April 19
  - Bernie Worrell, American keyboardist, composer (Parliament-Funkadelic) (d. 2016)
  - James Heckman, American economist, Nobel Prize laureate
  - Robert Holmes Bell, American district judge (d. 2023)
- April 20
  - Thein Sein, Burmese politician, 8th President of Myanmar
  - Doyle Lawson, American traditional bluegrass and Southern gospel musician
- April 21 – Paul Geremia, American singer-songwriter and guitarist
- April 22 – Steve Fossett, American millionaire aviator, sailor and adventurer (d. 2007)
- April 23 – Timothy Garden, Baron Garden, RAF pilot and politician (d. 2007)
- April 24 – Tony Visconti, American record producer, musician and singer
- April 25
  - Len Goodman, British ballroom dancer and television personality (d. 2023)
  - Park Soo-il, South Korean former footballer and football manager (d. 2008)
- April 26
  - Amien Rais, Indonesian politician
  - Larry H. Miller, American sports owner (Utah Jazz; d. 2009)
- April 27 – Cuba Gooding Sr., American actor and singer (d. 2017)
- April 28 – Jean-Claude Van Cauwenberghe, Belgian politician
- April 29
  - Princess Benedikte of Denmark
  - Richard Kline, American actor and television director
  - Francis Lee, English footballer (d. 2023)
  - Liu Chuanzhi, Chinese entrepreneur
- April 30
  - Rudi Assauer, German footballer and manager (d. 2019)
  - Jill Clayburgh, American actress (d. 2010)

=== May ===
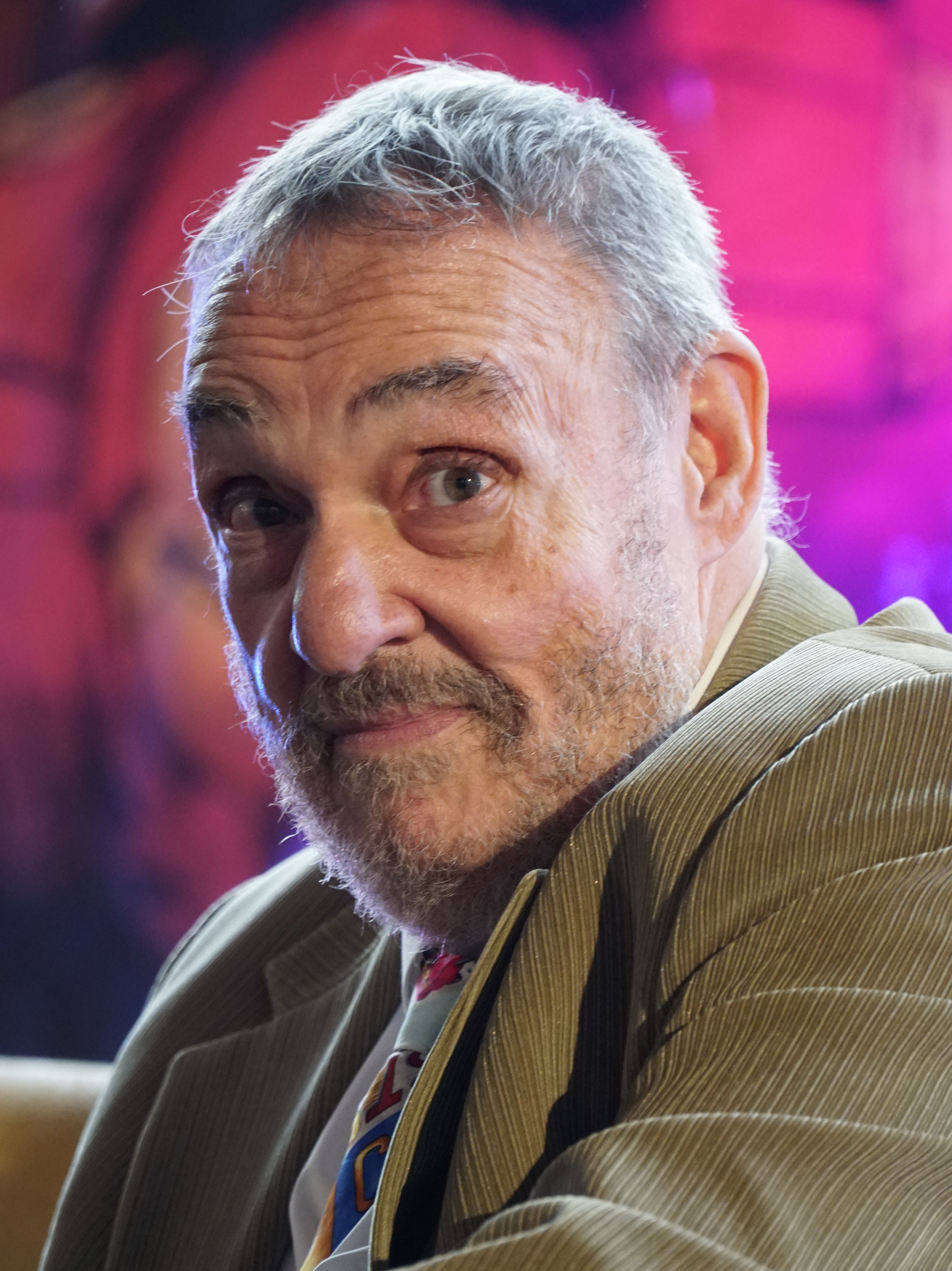
John Rhys-Davies

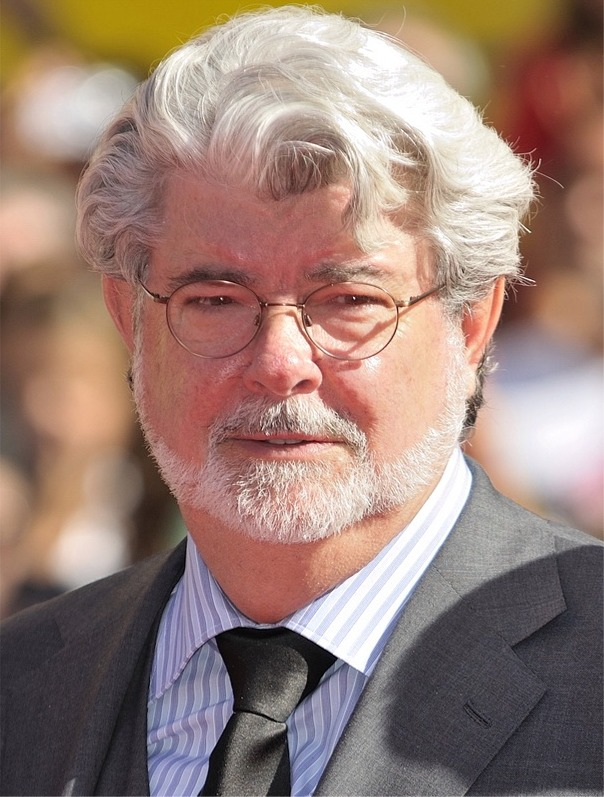
George Lucas

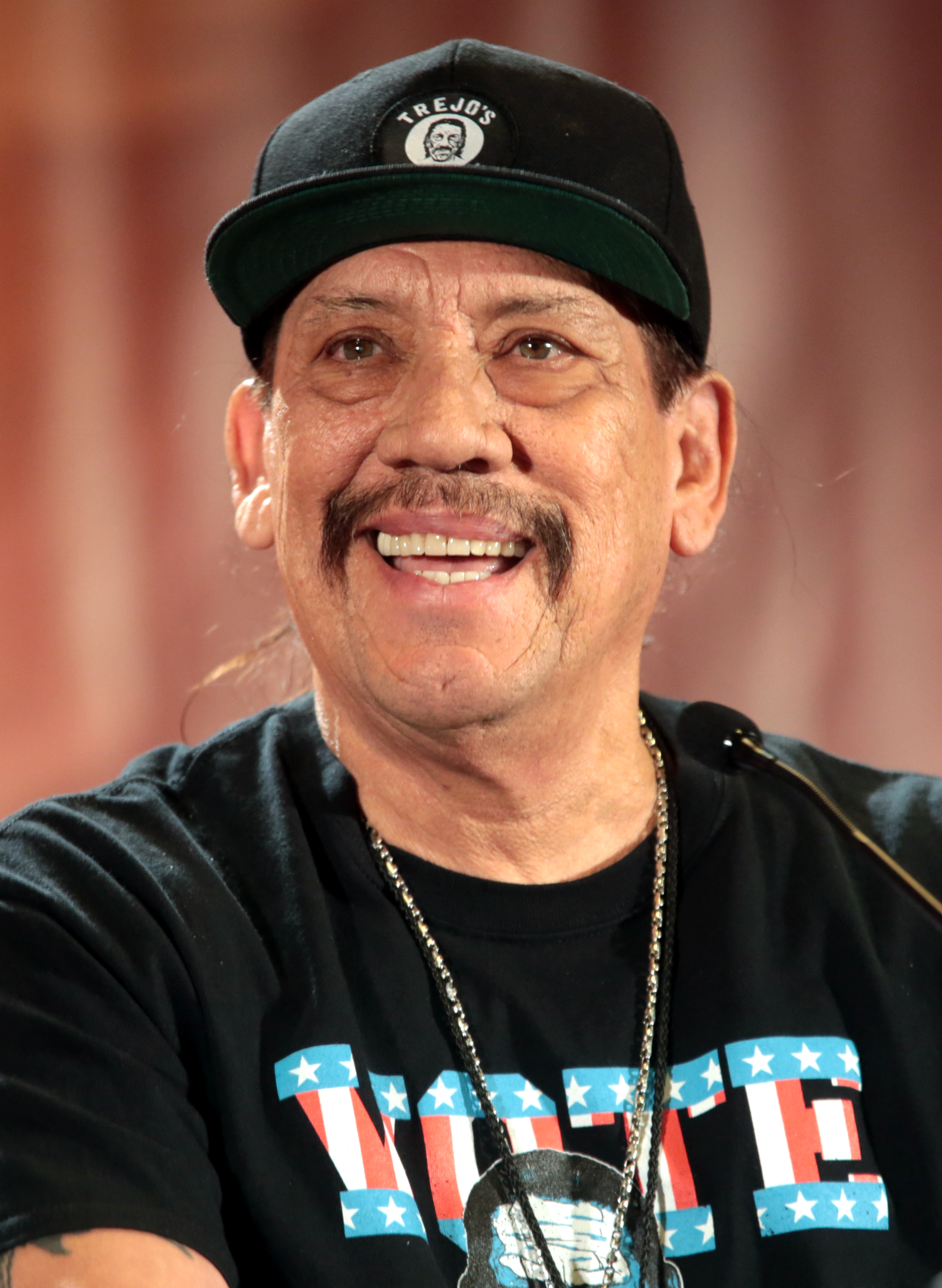
Danny Trejo

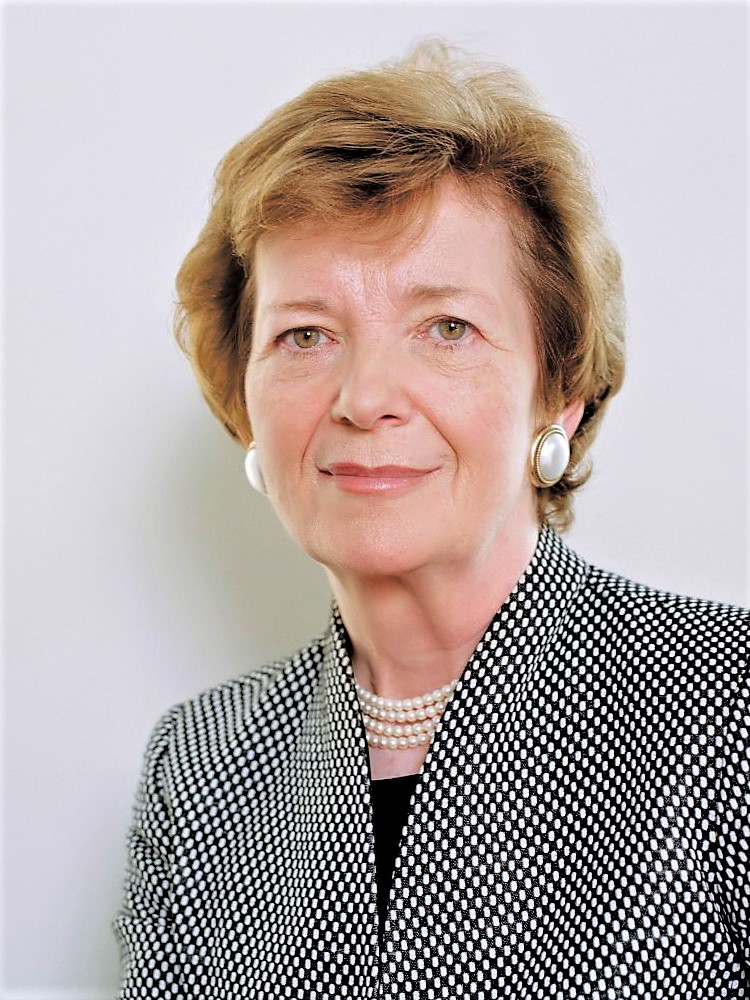
Mary Robinson

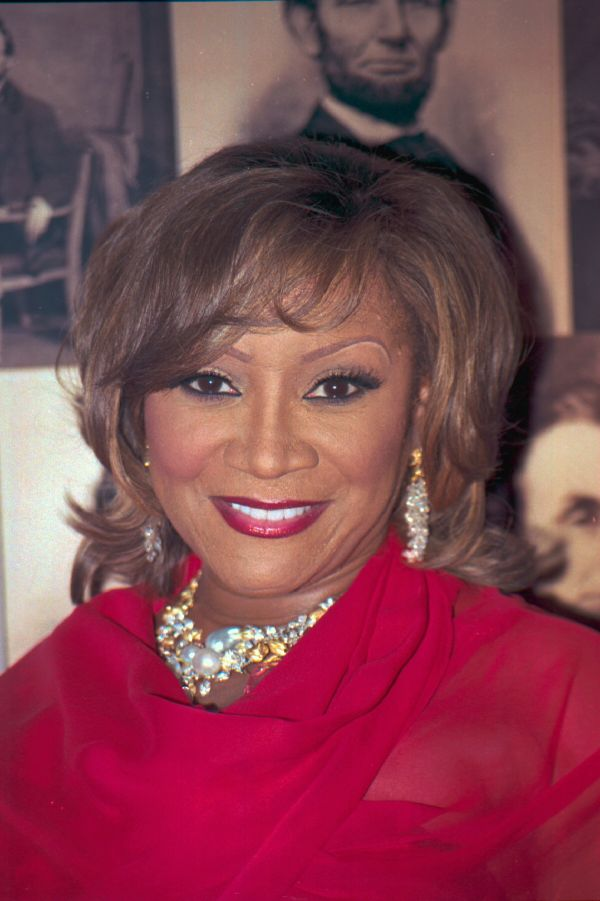
Patti LaBelle

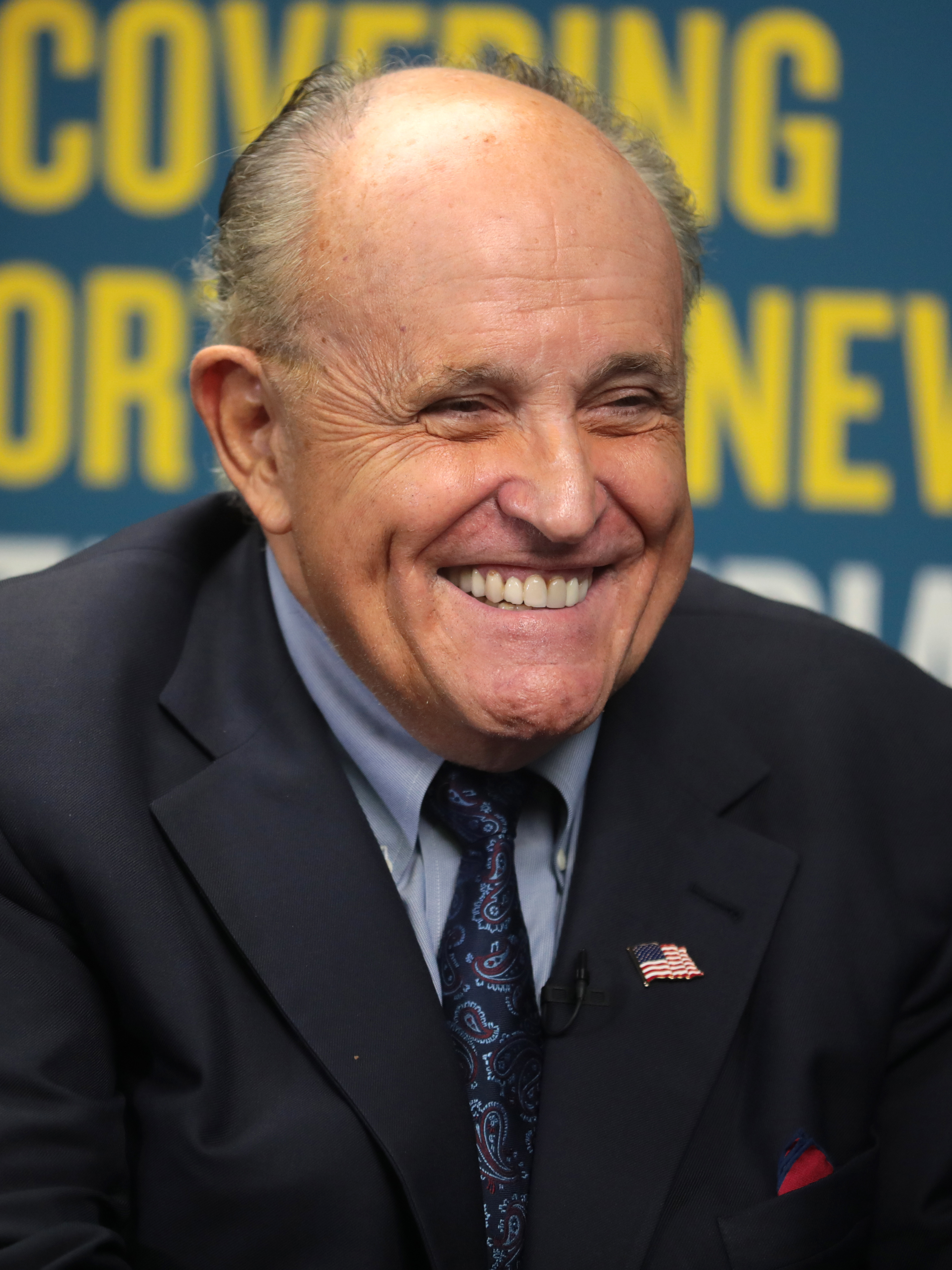
Rudy Giuliani

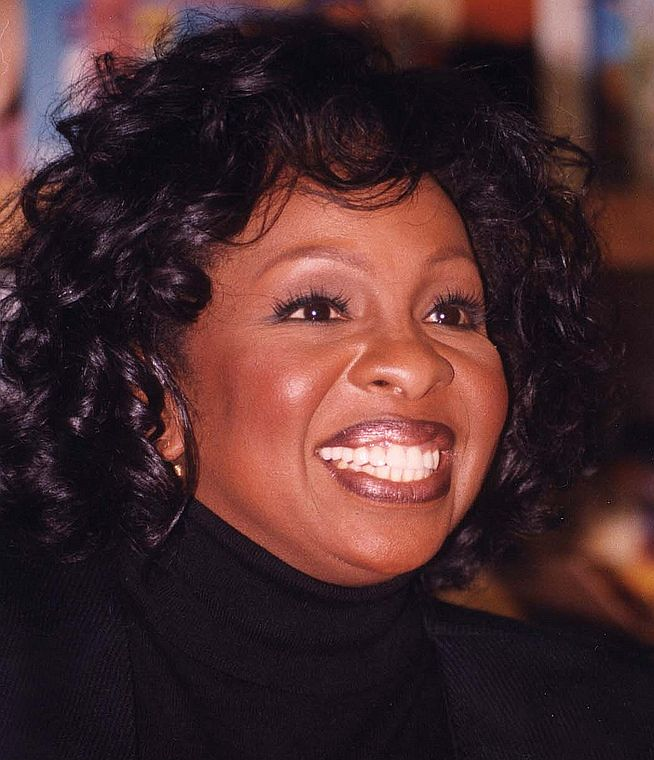
Gladys Knight

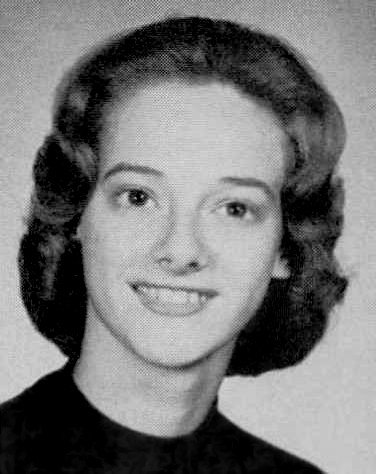
Sondra Locke

- May 1
  - Costa Cordalis, German singer (d. 2019)
  - Suresh Kalmadi, Indian politician (d. 2026)
  - Marva Whitney, American singer (d. 2012)
- May 2 – Gloria Lizárraga de Capriles, Venezuelan politician (d. 2021)
- May 3 – Rusty Wier, American singer-songwriter (d. 2009)
- May 4
  - Walker Boone, Canadian actor (d. 2021)
  - Russi Taylor, American actress (d. 2019)
- May 5
  - Roger Rees, Welsh actor and director (d. 2015)
  - John Rhys-Davies, Welsh actor
- May 6 – Mike Coulman, English dual-code rugby international (d. 2023)
- May 7 – Richard O'Sullivan, English comedy actor
- May 8
  - Gary Glitter (Paul Gadd), English glam rock singer and paedophile
  - David Vaughan, psychedelic artist (d. 2003)
- May 9
  - Richie Furay, American rock singer-songwriter (Poco, Buffalo Springfield)
  - Lars Norén, Swedish playwright, novelist and poet (d. 2021)
  - Laurence Owen, American figure skater (d. 1961)
- May 10
  - Jim Abrahams, American film director
  - Jackie Lomax, English rock singer-songwriter, guitarist (d. 2013)
- May 12
  - Sara Kestelman, English actress
  - Chris Patten, British politician
- May 13
  - Armistead Maupin, American fiction writer
  - Carolyn Franklin, American soul singer-songwriter (d. 1988)
- May 14
  - Connie Lawn, American journalist (d. 2018)
  - George Lucas, American film director and producer
- May 15 –Ulrich Beck, German sociologist (d. 2015)
- May 16 – Danny Trejo, Hispanic-American actor
- May 17 – Jesse Winchester, American-Canadian country singer-songwriter (d. 2014)
- May 18
  - Marianne Battani, American jurist (d. 2021)
  - Albert Hammond, British-Gibraltarian singer, songwriter and record producer
- May 19
  - Peter Mayhew, English-American actor (d. 2019)
  - Jaan Talts, Estonian-Soviet weightlifter
- May 20
  - Joe Cocker, English rock singer (d. 2014)
  - Boudewijn de Groot, Batavian-born Dutch folk singer-songwriter
  - Pekka Siitoin, Finnish neo-Nazi and Satanist (d. 2003)
- May 21 – Mary Robinson, President of Ireland
- May 22 – Roberto A. Abad, Filipino lawyer
- May 23
  - John Newcombe, Australian tennis player
  - Avraham Oz, Israeli theater professor, translator and political activist
- May 24
  - Patti LaBelle, American singer, actress and entrepreneur
  - David Mark Berger, Israeli weightlifter (d. 1972)
  - Heleen Sancisi-Weerdenburg, Dutch ancient historian
  - Dominique Lavanant, French film and theatrical actress
- May 25 – Frank Oz, English puppeteer and film director
- May 26 – Jan Schakowsky, U.S. Representative, Illinois's 9th congressional district
- May 27
  - Chris Dodd, American politician
  - Jon Brittenum, American football player (d. 2022)
  - Alain Souchon, French singer-songwriter and actor
- May 28
  - Rudy Giuliani, American politician, Mayor of New York City
  - Gladys Knight, American singer
  - Sondra Locke, American actress and director (d. 2018)
  - Rita MacNeil, Canadian folk singer (d. 2013)
  - Gary Stewart, American country rock singer-songwriter and musician (d. 2003)
  - Patricia Quinn (Lady Stephens), Northern Irish actress
- May 29 – Helmut Berger, Austrian actor (d. 2023)
- May 30 – Meredith MacRae, American actress (d. 2000)
- May 31 – Ayad Allawi, 38th Prime Minister of Iraq

=== June ===
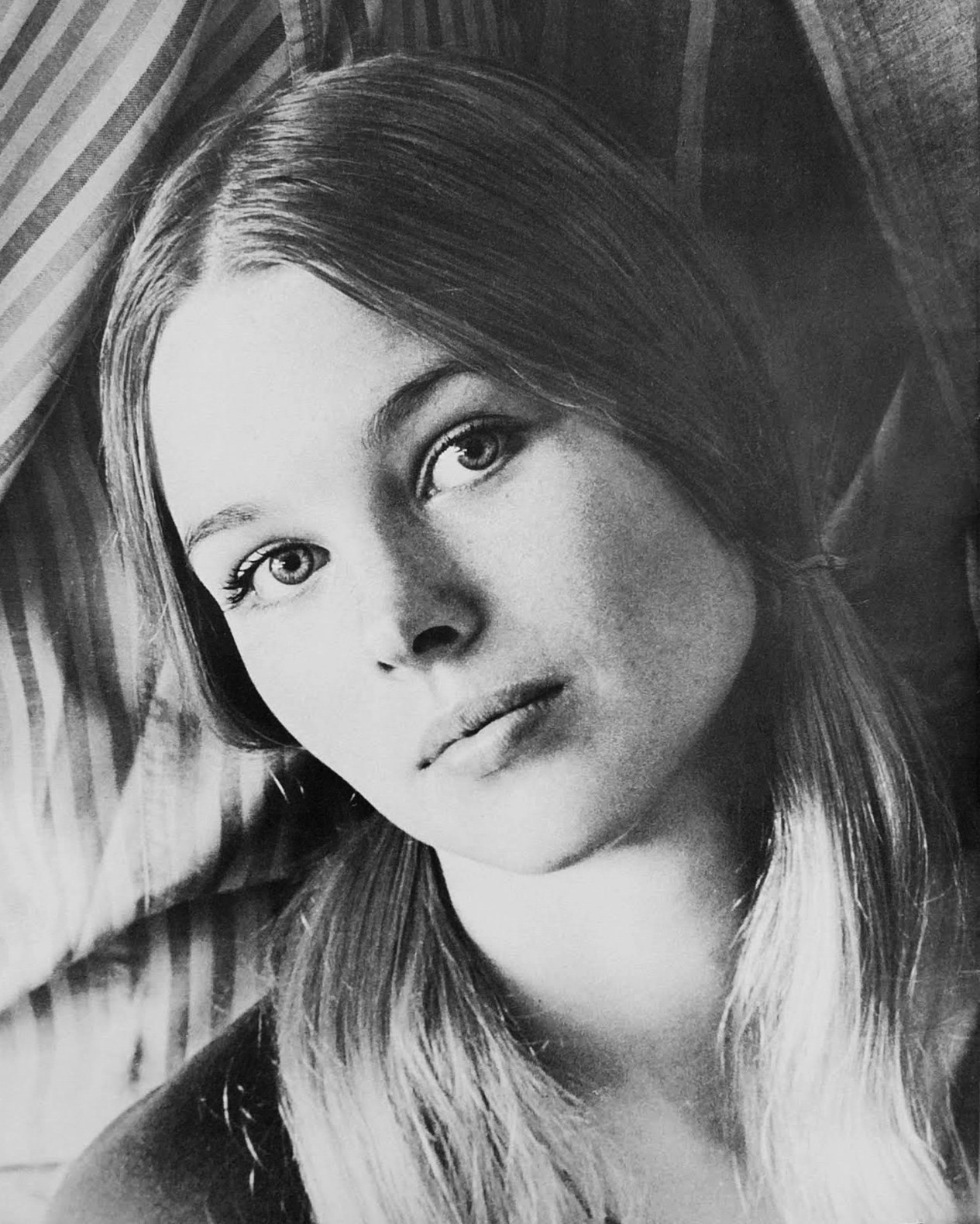
Michelle Phillips

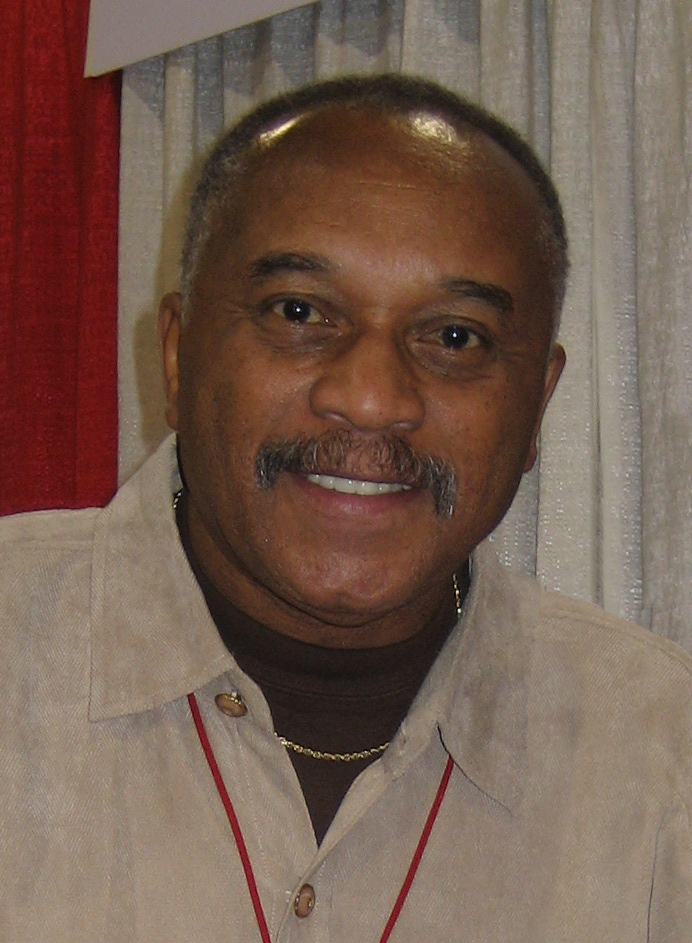
Tommie Smith

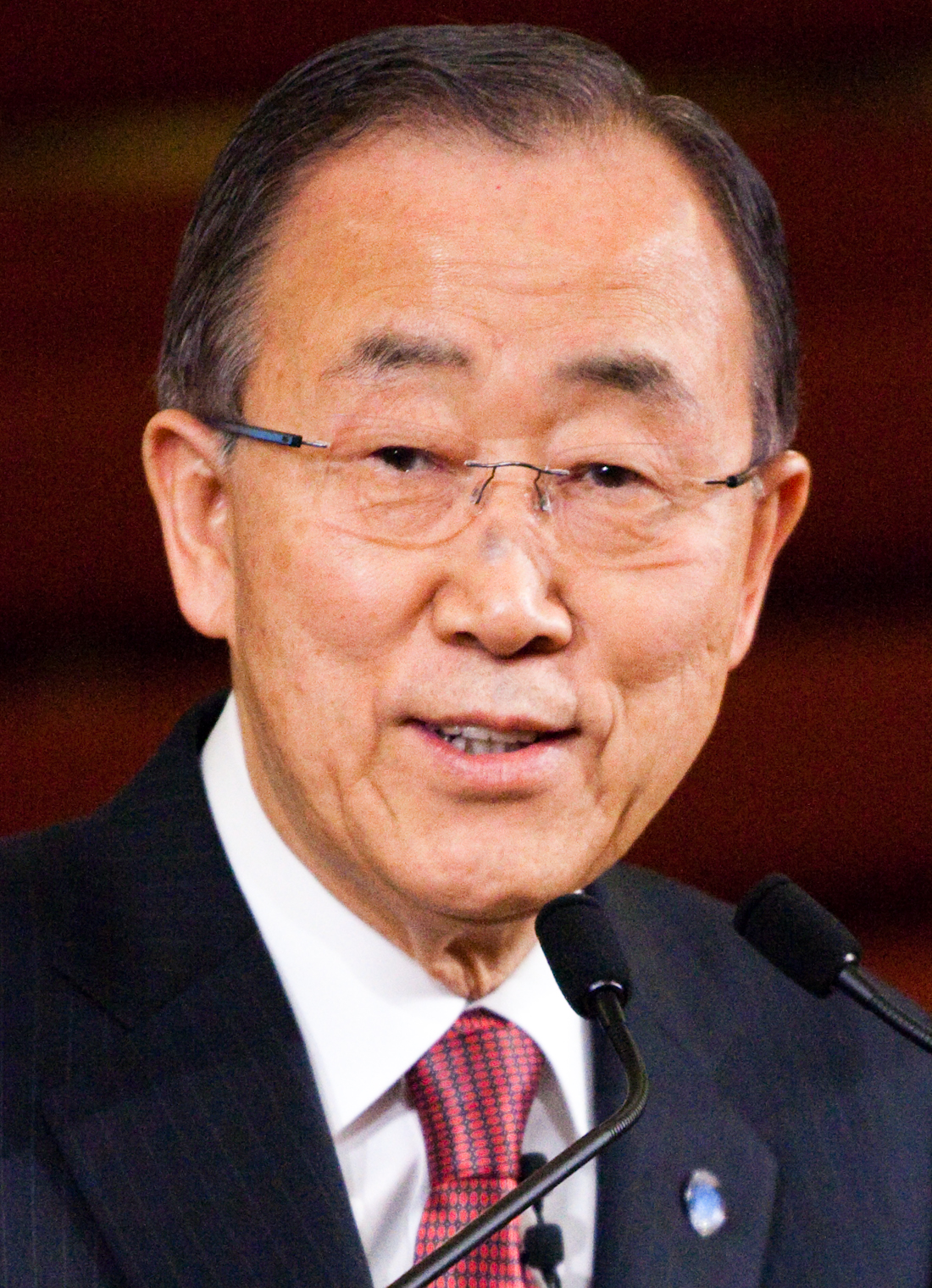
Ban Ki-moon

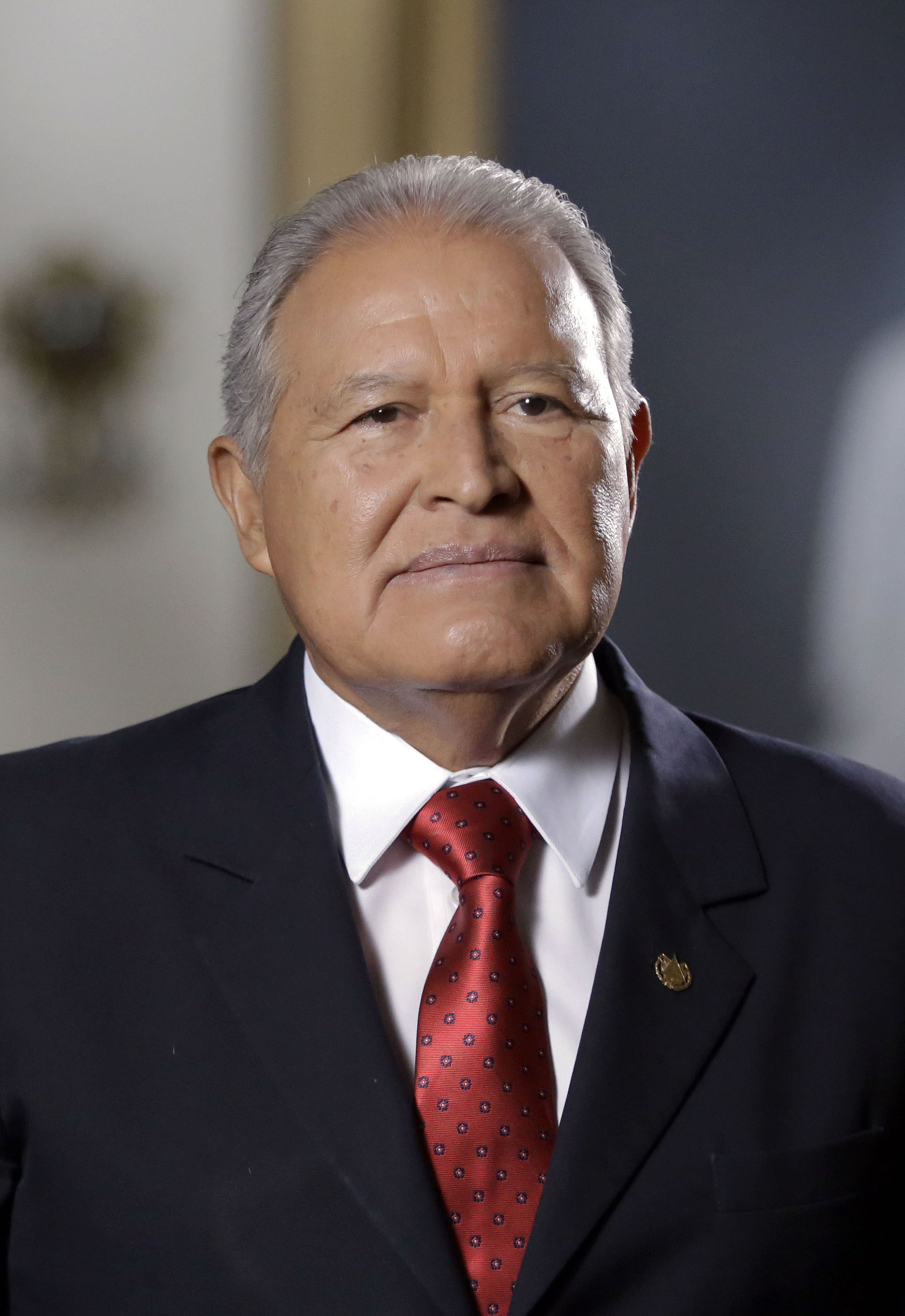
Salvador Sánchez Cerén

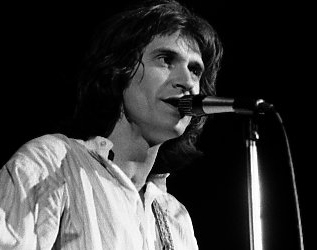
Sir Ray Davies

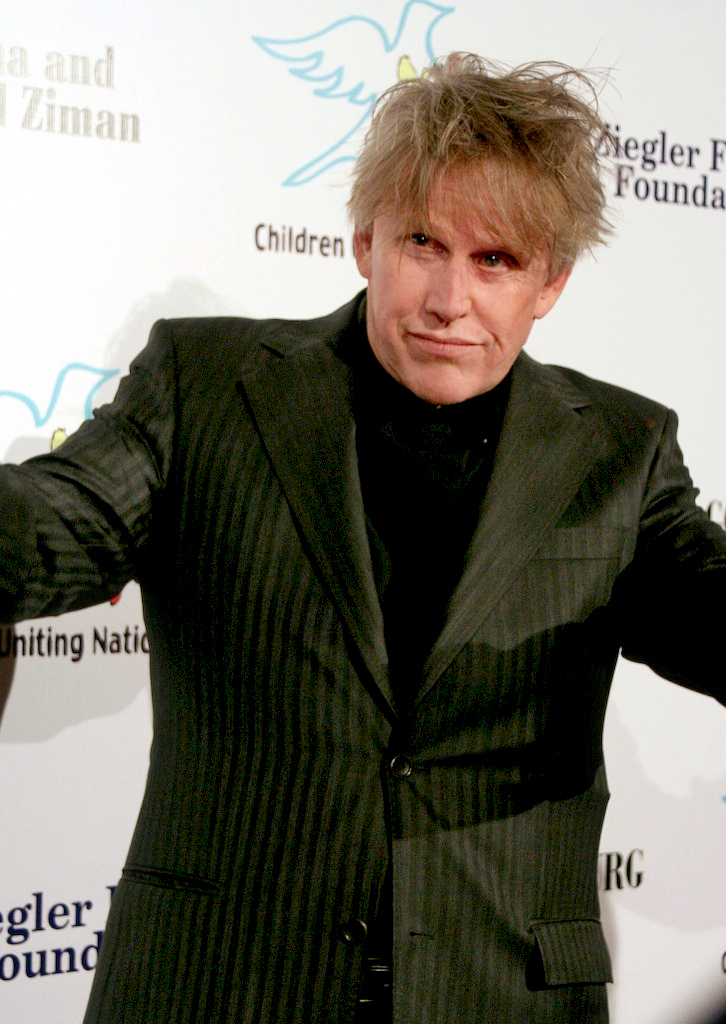
Gary Busey

- June 1
  - Robert Powell, English actor
  - Rafael Viñoly, Uruguayan-born architect (d. 2023)
  - Colin Blakemore, neurobiologist (d. 2022)
- June 2
  - Garo Yepremian, American football player (d. 2015)
  - Marvin Hamlisch, American composer and conductor (d. 2012)
- June 3
  - Edith McGuire, American sprinter
  - Mary Thom, American journalist and author (d. 2013)
  - Peter Bonfield, British businessman
- June 4 – Michelle Phillips, American singer and actress
- June 5
  - Colm Wilkinson, Irish actor and singer
  - Whitfield Diffie, American cryptographer
- June 6
  - Reuven Bulka, Canadian rabbi, writer, broadcaster and activist (d. 2021)
  - Edgar Froese, German electronic musician (d. 2015)
  - Bud Harrelson, American baseball player (d. 2024)
  - Phillip Allen Sharp, American scientist, recipient of the Nobel Prize in Physiology or Medicine
  - Tommie Smith, American athlete
- June 7
  - Annette Lu, Taiwanese politician, 8th Vice President of the Republic of China
  - Cazzie Russell, American former professional basketball player and coach
- June 8
  - Mark Belanger, American baseball player (d. 1998)
  - Don Grady, American actor and singer (d. 2012)
  - Marc Ouellet, Canadian cardinal
  - Boz Scaggs, American singer and guitarist
- June 10
  - Ze'ev Friedman, Israeli weightlifter (d. 1972)
  - Eegje Schoo, Dutch politician and diplomat
- June 11 – Alan Howarth, Baron Howarth of Newport, English politician, Minister for Culture, Communications and Creative Industries
- June 13 – Ban Ki-moon, South Korean politician and 8th Secretary-General of the United Nations
- June 15 – Malaysia Vasudevan, Tamil playback singer and actor (d. 2011)
- June 16 – Henri Richelet, French painter (d. 2020)
- June 17 – Bill Rafferty, American comedian and impressionist (d. 2012)
- June 18
  - Salvador Sánchez Cerén, 45th President of El Salvador
  - Rick Griffin, American graphic artist (d. 1991)
  - Sandy Posey, American pop singer
  - Bonar Sianturi, Indonesian army officer (d. 2022)
- June 19 – Chico Buarque, Brazilian singer-songwriter
- June 21
  - Carmen Cardinali, Chilean professor, governor of Rapa Nui
  - Franco Cordova, Italian international football player
  - Corinna Tsopei, Greek actress, model and beauty queen, winner of Miss Universe 1964
  - Sir Ray Davies, English rock singer-songwriter, co-founder of The Kinks
  - Kenny O'Dell, American country singer-songwriter (d. 2018)
  - Tony Scott, English film director (d. 2012)
  - Luigi Sgarbozza, Italian road racing cyclist
  - Chris Wood, English rock musician (Traffic) (d. 1983)
- June 22
  - Ercole Gualazzini, Italian professional road bicycle racer
  - Gérard Mourou, French electrical engineer, recipient of the Nobel Prize in Physics
- June 23
  - Silvestre Bello III, Filipino businessman and lawyer
  - Gan Ee Kiang, Malaysian pharmacologist
  - Dionys Baeriswyl, Swiss theoretical physicist (d. 2023)
- June 24
  - Jeff Beck, English rock musician (d. 2023)
  - Dennis Butler, English footballer and football manager
  - John "Charlie" Whitney, English guitarist
- June 25 – Ricardo Salgado, Portuguese economist and banker
- June 27
  - Paul Koslo, German-Canadian actor (d. 2019)
  - Zezé Motta, Brazilian actress and singer
  - Patrick Sercu, Belgian cyclist (d. 2019)
- June 28 – Luis Nicolao, Argentine butterfly swimmer
- June 29
  - Gary Busey, American actor
  - Seán Patrick O'Malley, American cardinal
- June 30
  - Daniel Kablan Duncan, Ivorian politician
  - Terry Funk, American professional wrestler (d. 2023)
  - Raymond Moody, American parapsychologist
  - Alan C. Fox, American author, philanthropist and entrepreneur
  - Glenn Shorrock, English-born Australian rock singer-songwriter

=== July ===
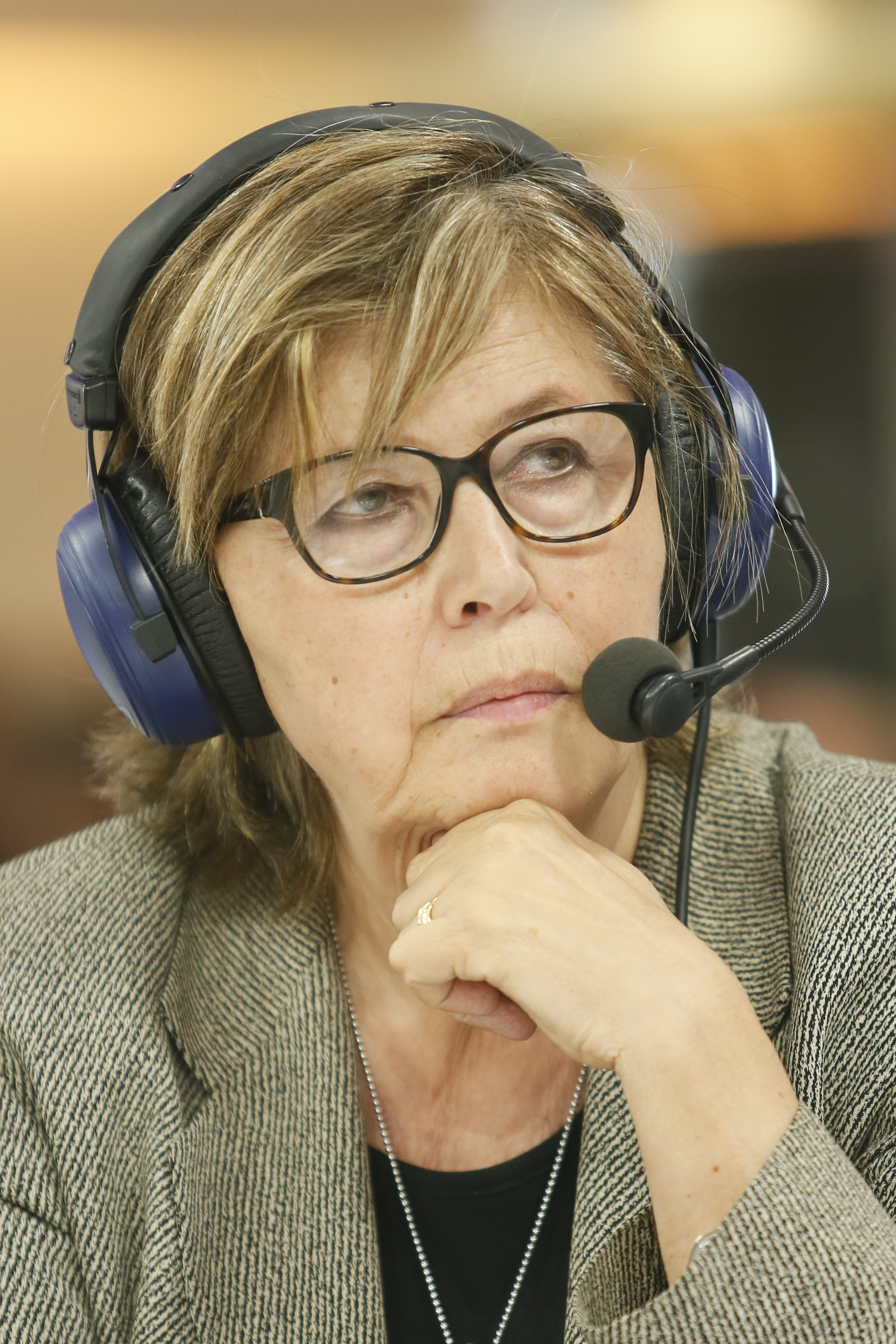
Mercedes Bresso

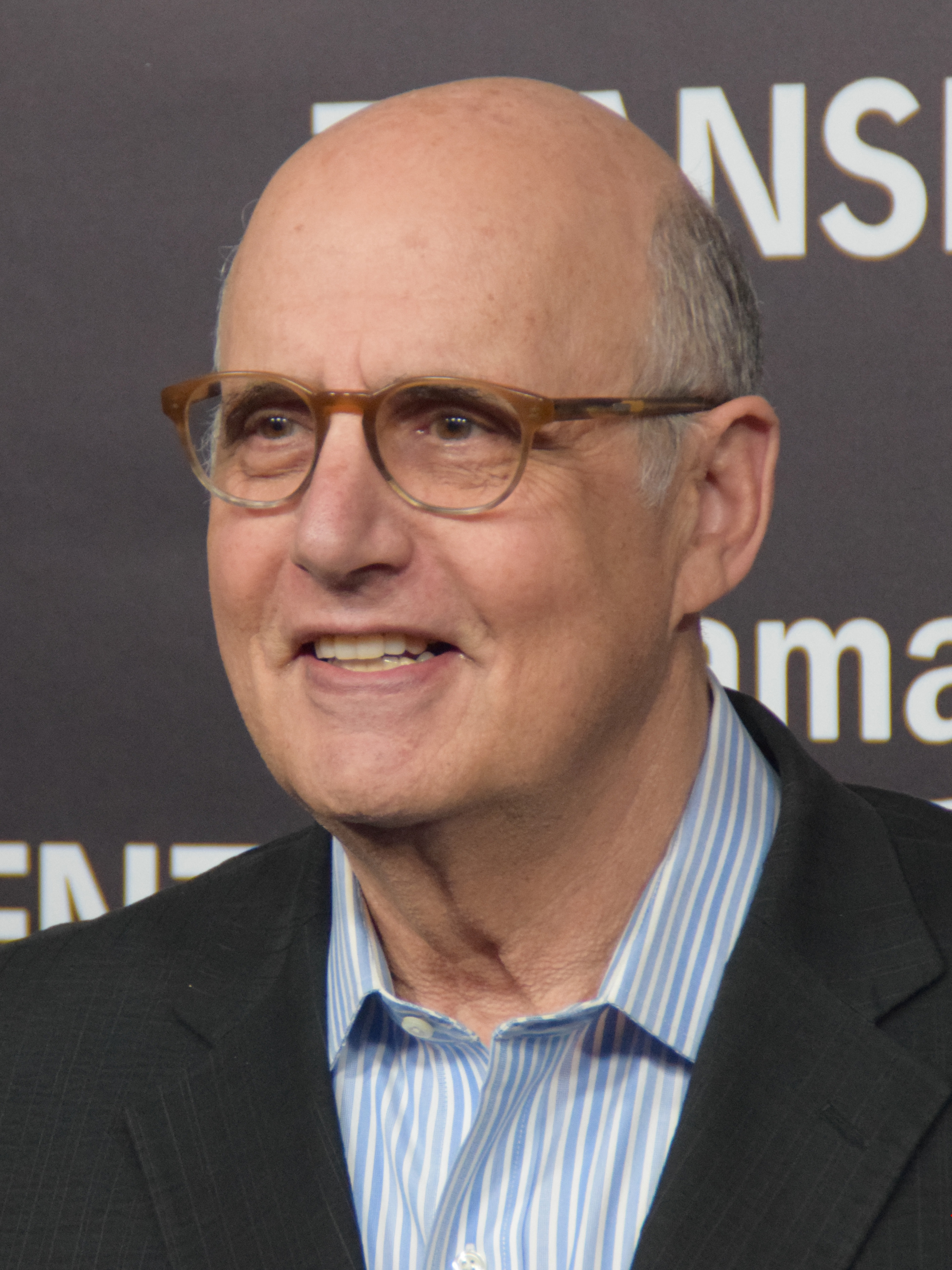
Jeffrey Tambor

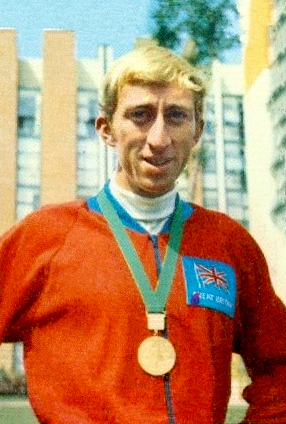
David Hemery

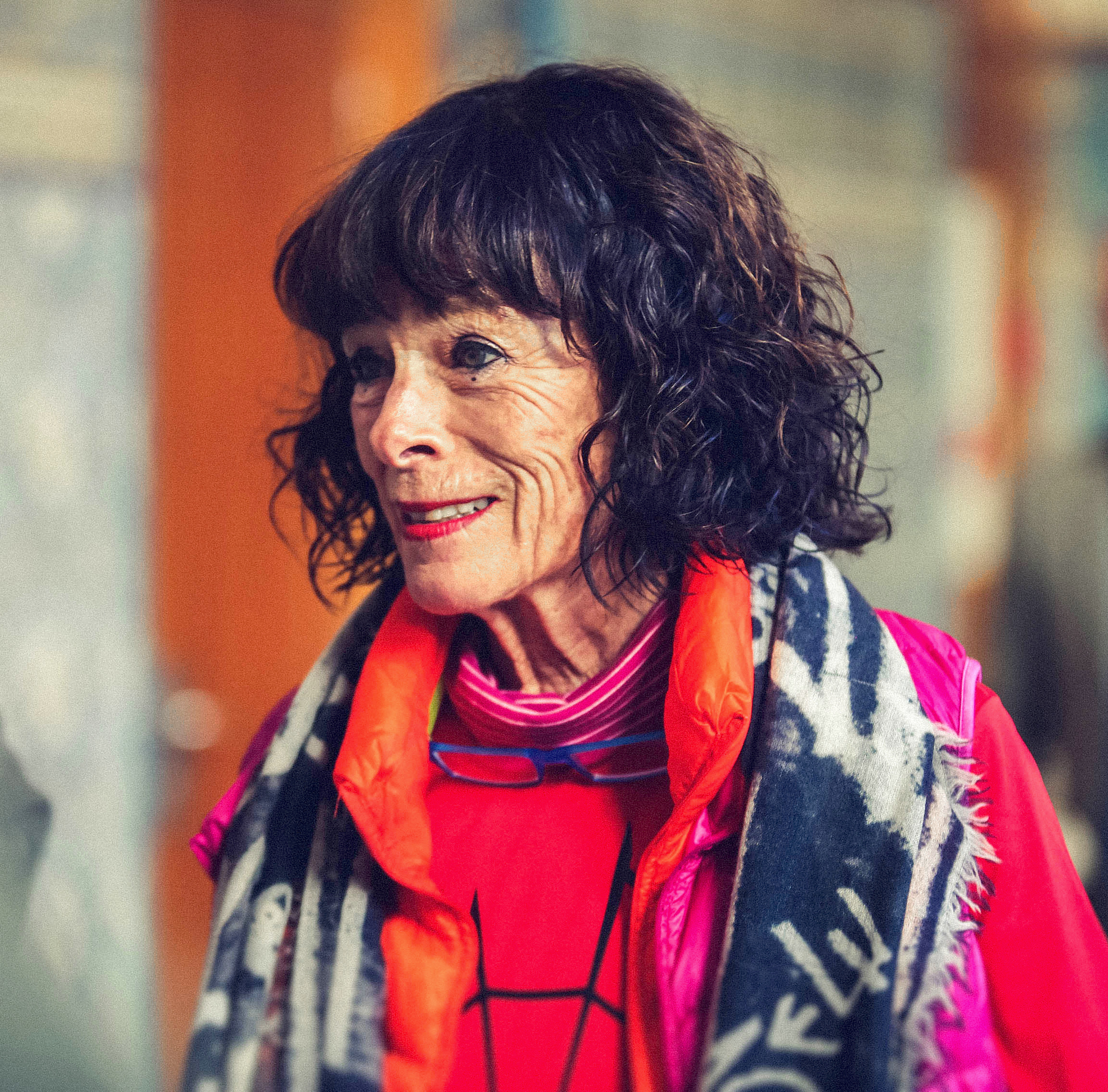
Geraldine Chaplin

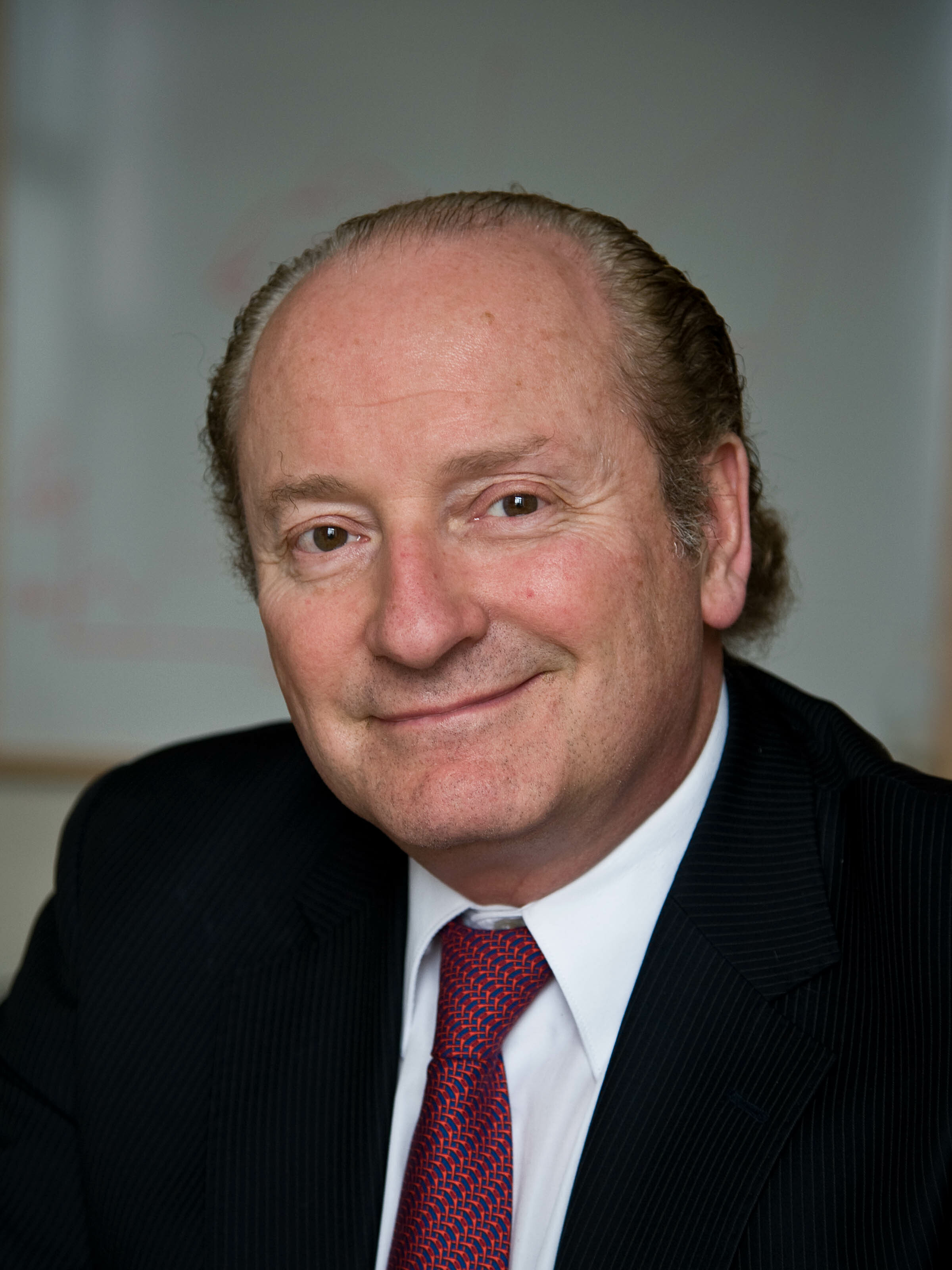
Robert C. Merton

- July 1
  - Mercedes Bresso, Italian politician
  - Mike Horan, Australian politician
  - Nurul Haque Miah, Bangladeshi professor of chemistry and textbook writer (d. 2021)
  - Diron Talbert, American football player
  - Syd Jackson, Australian rules footballer
  - Salgueiro Maia, captain in the Portuguese army and revolutionary (d. 1992)
- July 2
  - Billy Campbell, Northern Irish footballer
  - Vicente de la Mata, Argentine football midfielder
  - Paul Schudel, American football player and coach
- July 3 – Michel Polnareff, French singer
- July 4
  - Joe Berardo, Portuguese businessman, investor and art collector
  - Joe Critchlow, Canadian football player
  - Albert Kapengut, Soviet chess master
- July 5
  - Mick Andrews, English international motorcycle trials rider
  - Hendrik Born, German vice admiral
  - Enrique Irazoqui, Spanish movie actor
- July 6
  - Tim Brown, Australian darts player
  - Gunhild Hoffmeister, East German middle-distance runner
  - Max Timisela, Indonesian footballer
- July 7
  - Feri Cansel, Turkish-Cypriot actress (d. 1983)
  - Nicholas, Crown Prince of Montenegro
  - Mark Burgess, New Zealand cricketer
  - Jürgen Grabowski, German footballer (d. 2022)
  - Tony Jacklin, English golfer
  - George Logan, British female impersonator of the comedy act Hinge and Bracket
  - Feleti Sevele, Prime Minister of Tonga
  - Michael Walker, Baron Walker of Aldringham, British Army officer
  - Glenys Kinnock, British politician (d. 2023)
  - Ian Wilmut, British embryologist (d. 2023)
- July 8
  - Johanny "Jaimoe" Johanson, American drummer
  - Jeffrey Tambor, American actor
  - William H. Pitsenbarger, United States Air Force Medal of Honour recipient (d. 1966)
- July 10 – Carlos Ruckauf, Argentine politician
- July 11
  - Keith Doncon, Australian rules footballer
  - Neil Vant, Canadian Anglican clergyman, prospector, businessman and political figure
  - Valdeir Vieira, Brazilian football manager
  - Peter de Savary, British entrepreneur (d. 2022)
- July 12
  - Terry Cooper, English football player and manager
  - Denise Nicholas, American actress and social activist
  - Delia Ephron, American bestselling author, screenwriter, and playwright
- July 13 – Ernő Rubik, Hungarian inventor
- July 15 – Klaas de Vries, Dutch composer
- July 16
  - Clarence Parfitt, Bermudian and Scottish cricketer
  - Jose L. Cuisia Jr., Philippine diplomat and banker
  - Betty Davis, American singer, songwriter and model (d. 2022)
- July 17
  - Mark Burgess, New Zealand cricket captain
  - Catherine Schell, Hungarian actress
  - Charles Lapointe, Canadian businessman, politician and public servant
  - Tom Kalinske, American businessman
  - Carlos Alberto Torres, Brazilian footballer (d. 2016)
- July 18
  - David Hemery, British Olympic athlete
  - William Harrison Courtney, American professor and retired diplomat
- July 20
  - Mel Daniels, American basketball player and coach (d. 2015)
  - W. Cary Edwards, American politician (d. 2010)
- July 21
  - John Atta Mills, 13th President of Ghana (d. 2012)
  - Paul Wellstone, U.S. Senator from Minnesota (d. 2002)
- July 26
  - Celeste Yarnall, American actress (d. 2018)
  - Kiel Martin, American actor (d. 1990)
- July 27
  - Tony Capstick, English comedian, actor and musician (d. 2003)
  - Matthew Robinson, English television and film producer, director and writer
  - Philip Freriks, Dutch journalist, columnist and television presenter
- July 28 – Jozo Križanović, Bosnian politician (d. 2009)
- July 30
  - Jimmy Cliff, Jamaican musician (d. 2025)
  - Frances de la Tour, English actress
- July 31
  - Geraldine Chaplin, English-American actress
  - Robert C. Merton, American economist, Nobel Prize laureate
  - Jonathan Dimbleby, English broadcaster and journalist
  - Tommy Robson, English footballer (Northampton Town, Chelsea, Newcastle United, Peterborough United) (d. 2020)

=== August ===
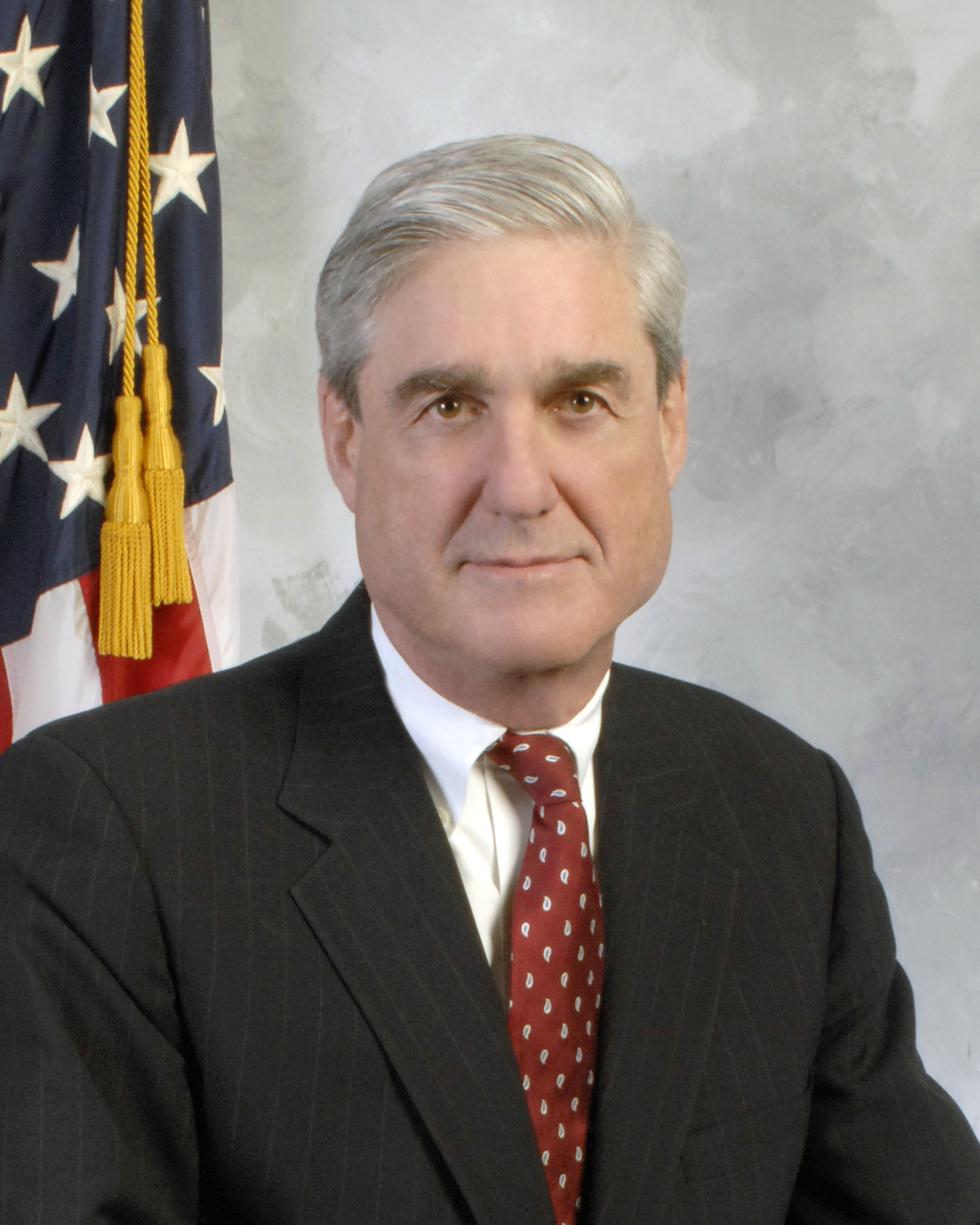
Robert Mueller

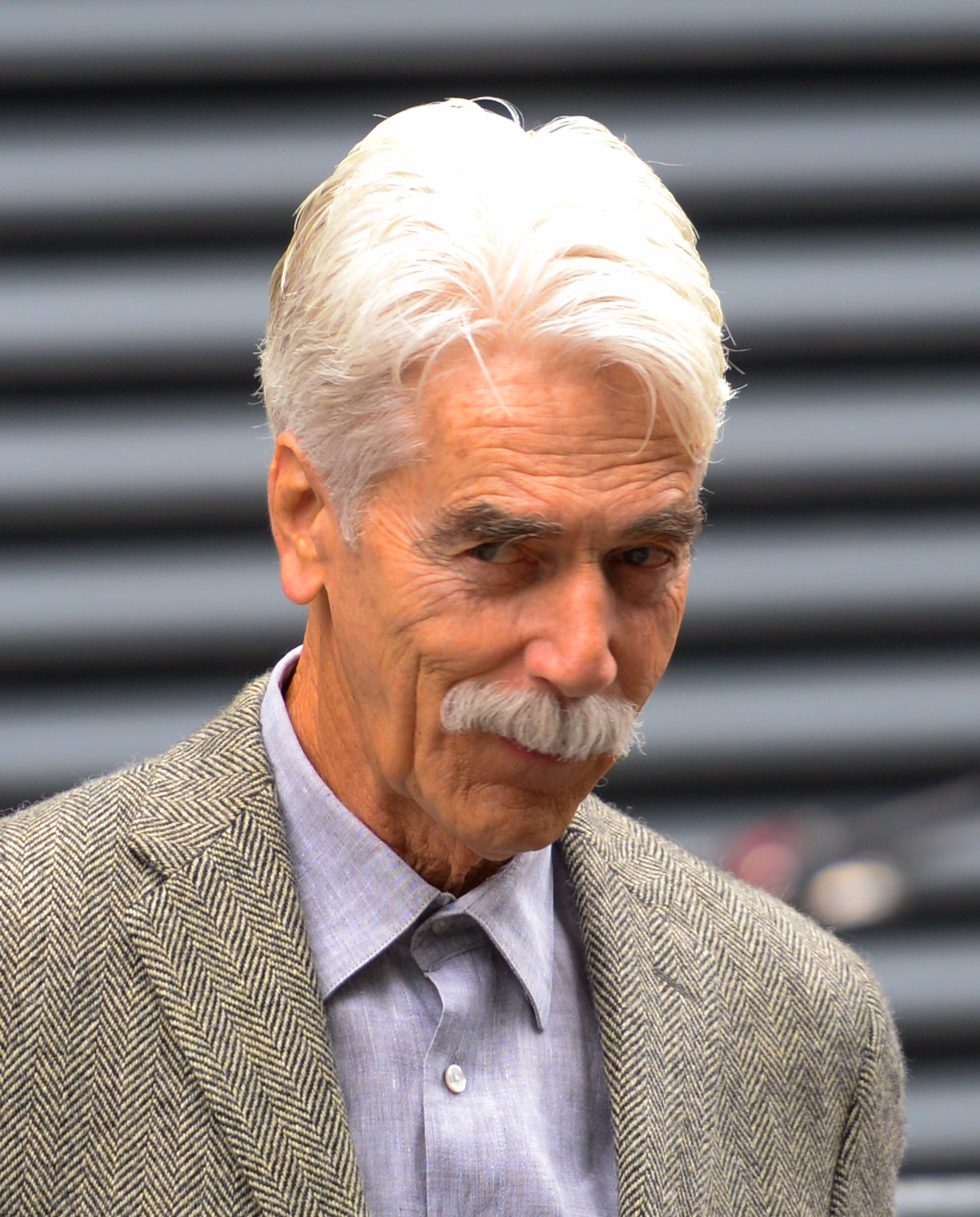
Sam Elliott

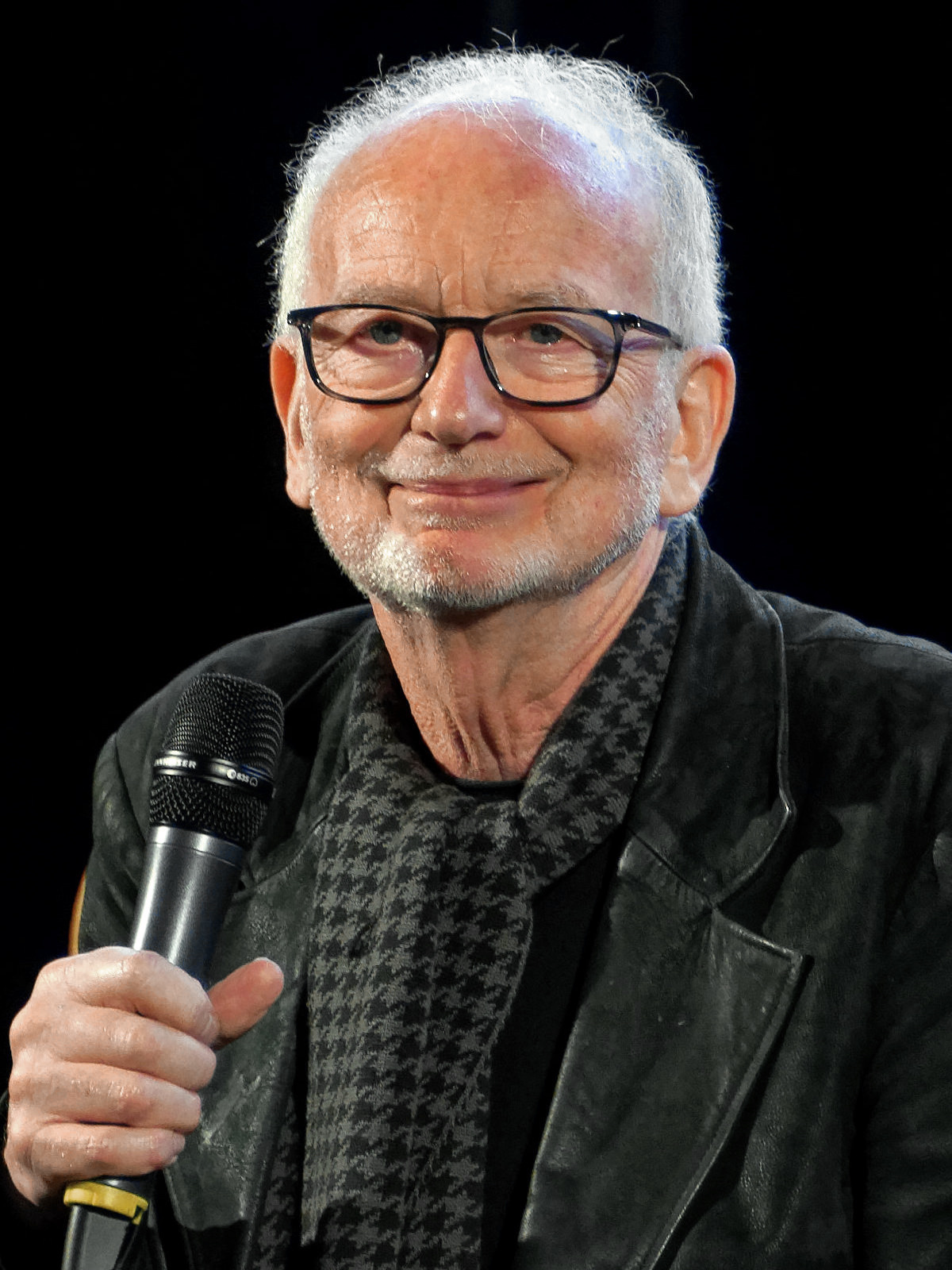
Ian McDiarmid

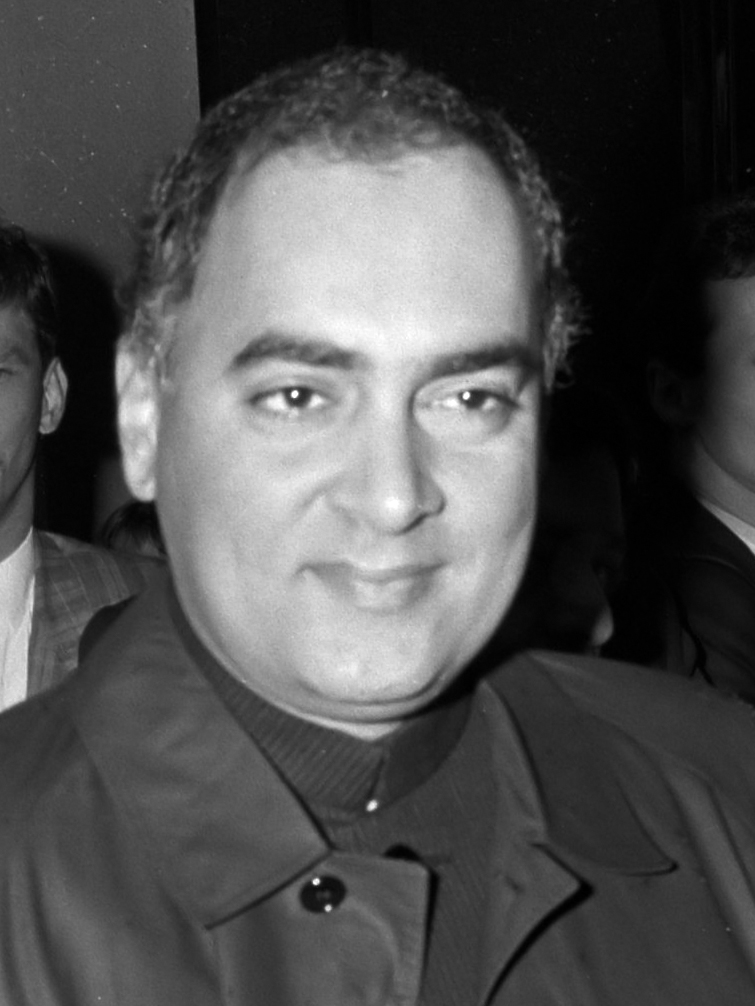
Rajiv Gandhi

- August 1
  - Yury Romanenko, Soviet cosmonaut
  - Andrew G. Vajna, Hungarian-American film producer (d. 2019)
- August 2
  - Jim Capaldi, British drummer, singer and songwriter (d. 2005)
  - Naná Vasconcelos, Brazilian percussionist and vocalist (d. 2016)
  - Joanna Cassidy, American actress and former model
- August 3 – Jonas Falk, Swedish actor (d. 2010)
- August 4
  - William Frankfather, American actor (d. 1998)
  - Orhan Gencebay, Turkish musician, composer, singer and actor
  - Richard Belzer, American actor and comedian (d. 2023 in France)
- August 7
  - John Glover, American actor
  - Robert Mueller, American lawyer, FBI director (d. 2026)
  - Denny Freeman, American guitarist (d. 2021)
- August 8
  - Michael Johnson, American singer-songwriter and guitarist (d. 2017)
  - Hasyim Muzadi, Indonesian Islamic scholar (d. 2017)
- August 9
  - Sam Elliott, American actor
  - Patricia McKissack, African American children's writer (d. 2017)
- August 10
  - Luisa Teresa Pacheco, Venezuelan politician
  - Abdul Latif Rashid, Iraqi Kurd politician and the ninth president of Iraq
- August 11
  - Ian McDiarmid, Scottish actor
  - Frederick W. Smith, American founder of FedEx (d. 2025)
- August 12 – Larry Troutman, American funk musician (d. 1999)
- August 13 – Kevin Tighe, American actor
- August 14 – Ahad Hosseini, Iranian Azerbaijani artist
- August 15
  - Linda Ellerbee, American journalist and author
  - Thomas J. Murphy, Jr., politician, 56th Mayor of Pittsburgh
  - Yoweri Museveni, president of Uganda
  - R. A. W. Rhodes, British political scientist and academic
  - Sylvie Vartan, French singer
- August 17
  - Larry Ellison, co-founder of Oracle Corporation
  - Bobby Murdoch, Scottish footballer and football manager (d. 2001)
- August 18
  - Robert Hitchcock, Australian sculptor
  - Françoise Lebrun, French actress
  - Volker Lechtenbrink, German television actor and singer
  - Helena Rojo, Mexican actress and model
- August 19
  - Mordechai Spiegler, Israeli footballer and manager
  - Charles Wang, Chinese-born American businessman, philanthropist and sports team owner (d. 2018)
  - Bodil Malmsten, Swedish novelist and poet (d. 2016)
  - Steve Sloan, American football player and coach (d. 2024)
- August 20
  - Rajiv Gandhi, Prime Minister of India (d. 1991)
  - Brian Barnes, British artist (d. 2021)
- August 21
  - Kari S. Tikka, Finnish Professor of Finance (d. 2006)
  - Peter Weir, Australian film director
- August 22 – Ayşen Gruda, Turkish actress and comedian (d. 2019)
- August 23
  - Saira Banu, Indian actress
  - Roberto D'Aubuisson, Salvadorean Army officer and right-wing political leader (d. 1992)
- August 24
  - Rocky Johnson, Canadian professional wrestler and father of Dwayne Johnson (d. 2020)
  - Henry Braden, American lawyer and politician (d. 2013)
  - Gregory Jarvis, American astronaut (d. 1986)
- August 25
  - Pat Martino, American jazz guitarist (d. 2021)
  - Abdullah Tarmugi, Singaporean politician
  - Christine Chubbuck, American television reporter (d. 1974)
- August 26 – Prince Richard, Duke of Gloucester
- August 27 – G. W. Bailey, American actor
- August 28
  - Ray Lowry, English cartoonist (d. 2008)
  - Kay Parker, English pornography actress (d. 2022)
- August 30
  - Tug McGraw, American baseball player (d. 2004)
  - Freek de Jonge, Dutch cabaret performer and writer
  - John Surman, English jazz saxophone, clarinet, and synthesizer player and composer
- August 31
  - Jos LeDuc, Canadian professional wrestler (d. 1999)
  - Earnie Shavers, African-American professional boxer (d. 2022)
  - Roger Dean, English graphic artist

=== September ===
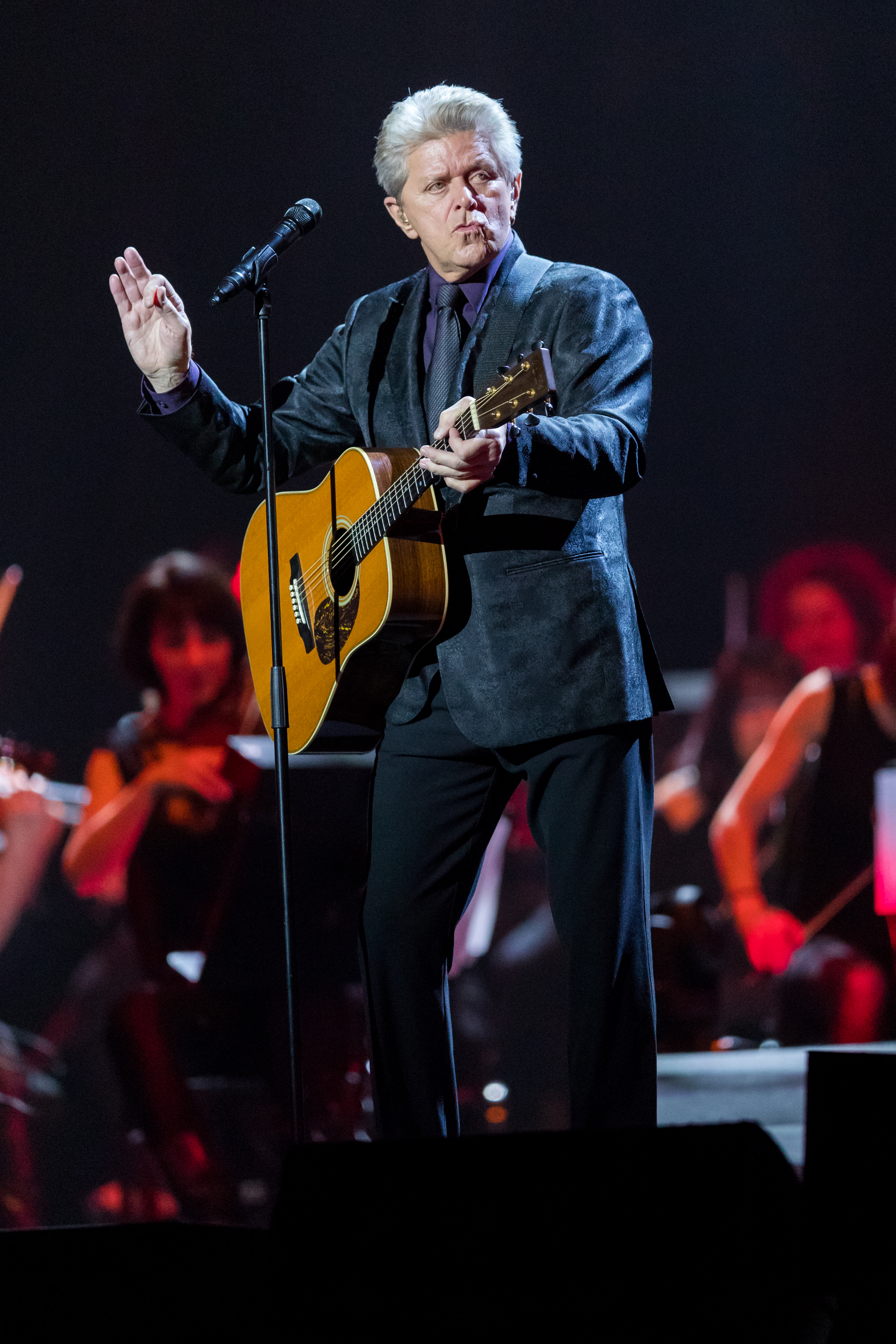
Peter Cetera

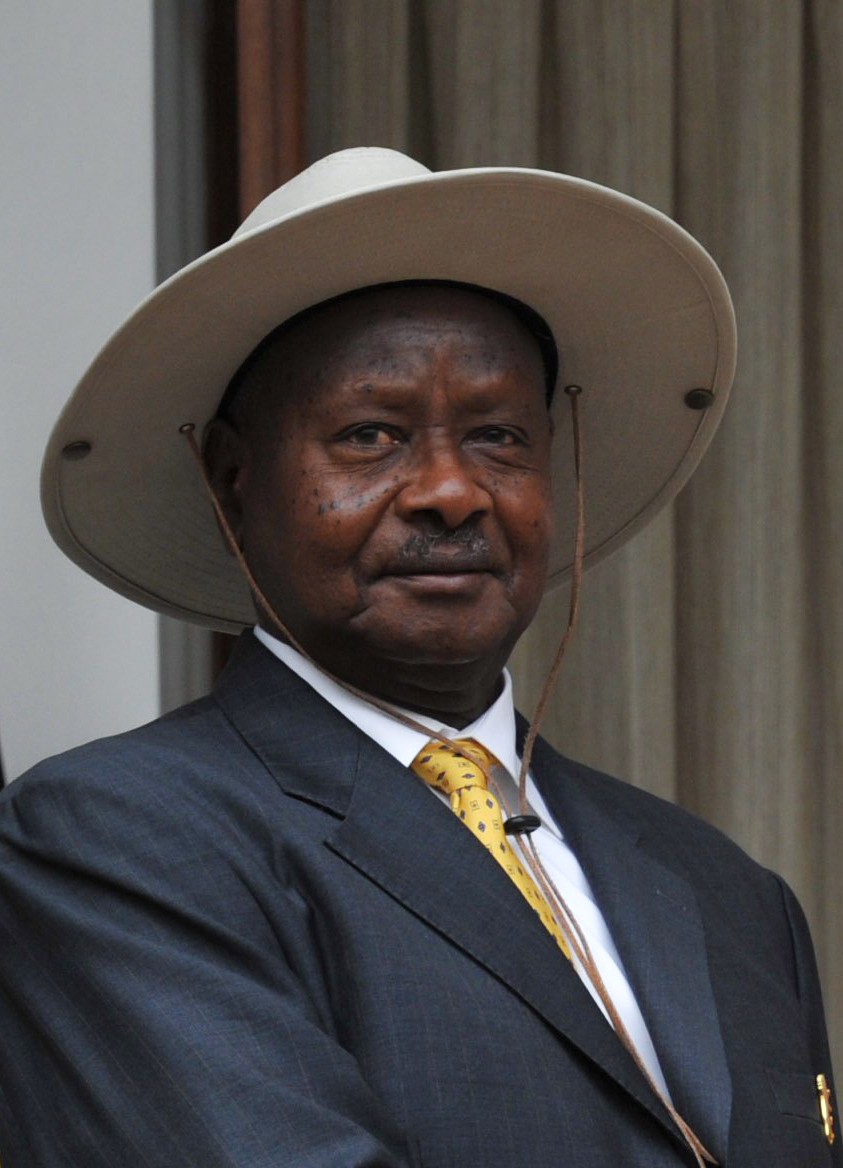
Yoweri Museveni

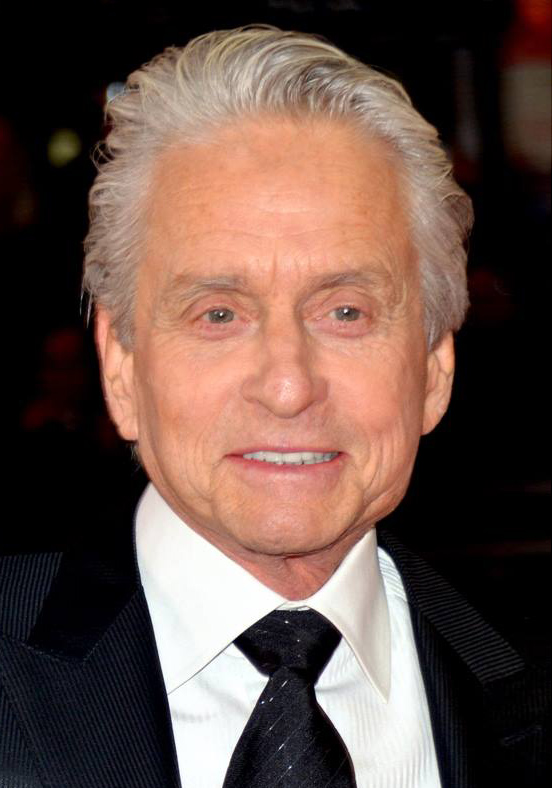
Michael Douglas

- September 1 – Leonard Slatkin, American conductor
- September 2 – Gilles Marchal, French singer-songwriter
- September 3 – Ty Warner, American businessman, inventor of Beanie Babies
- September 4
  - Tony Atkinson, British economist (d. 2017)
  - Dave Bassett, English football manager
  - Jennifer Salt, American producer, screenwriter, and former actress
- September 6
  - Christian Boltanski, French artist
  - Swoosie Kurtz, American actress
- September 7
  - Abul Hayat, Bangladeshi actor
  - Earl Manigault, American basketball player (d. 1998)
  - Bora Milutinović, Serbian footballer and coach
  - Sam Sloan, American chess player and autodidact
  - Jerry Relph, American politician, member of the Minnesota Senate (d. 2020)
- September 8
  - Bill Parkyn, American scientist (d. 2012)
  - Margaret Hodge, British politician
- September 9 – George Mraz, Czech-born American jazz bassist and alto saxophonist (d. 2021)
- September 11 – Serge Haroche, French physicist
- September 12
  - Leonard Peltier, Native American activist and convicted murderer
  - Vladimir Spivakov, Soviet and Russian conductor and violinist
  - Barry White, African-American singer (d. 2003)
- September 13
  - Carol Barnes, British newsreader (d. 2008)
  - Jacqueline Bisset, English actress
  - Peter Cetera, lead singer and guitarist of American rock group Chicago
- September 14 – Colleen Barrett, American business executive (d. 2024)
- September 15
  - Yoweri Museveni, Ugandan politician, 9th President of Uganda
  - Graham Taylor, English footballer and football manager (d. 2017)
- September 16 – B.J. Ward, American voice actress
- September 17 – Reinhold Messner, Italian mountaineer
- September 18
  - Veronica Carlson, English actress and model
  - Satan's Angel, American exotic dancer
- September 19 – İsmet Özel, Turkish poet
- September 20
  - Jeremy Child, English actor
  - Paul Madeley, English footballer (d. 2018)
- September 21
  - Caleb Deschanel, American cinematographer and film director
  - Hamilton Jordan, Jimmy Carter's first White House Chief of Staff (d. 2008)
- September 22 – Frazer Hines, British actor
- September 24 – Eavan Boland, Irish poet, author, and professor (d. 2020)
- September 25 – Michael Douglas, American actor and producer
- September 26
  - Anne Robinson, British television host
  - Victoria Vetri, American model and actress
- September 27
  - Angélica María, American-born Mexican singer-songwriter and actress
  - Ian Garnett, British admiral
- September 28 – Miloš Zeman, 3rd President of the Czech Republic
- September 30 – Jimmy Johnstone, Scottish footballer (d. 2006)

=== October ===
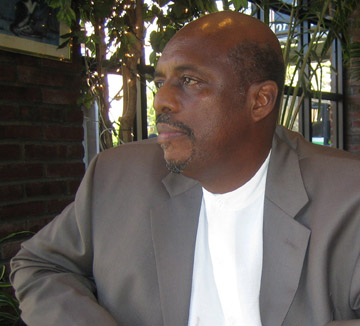
Arnhim Eustace

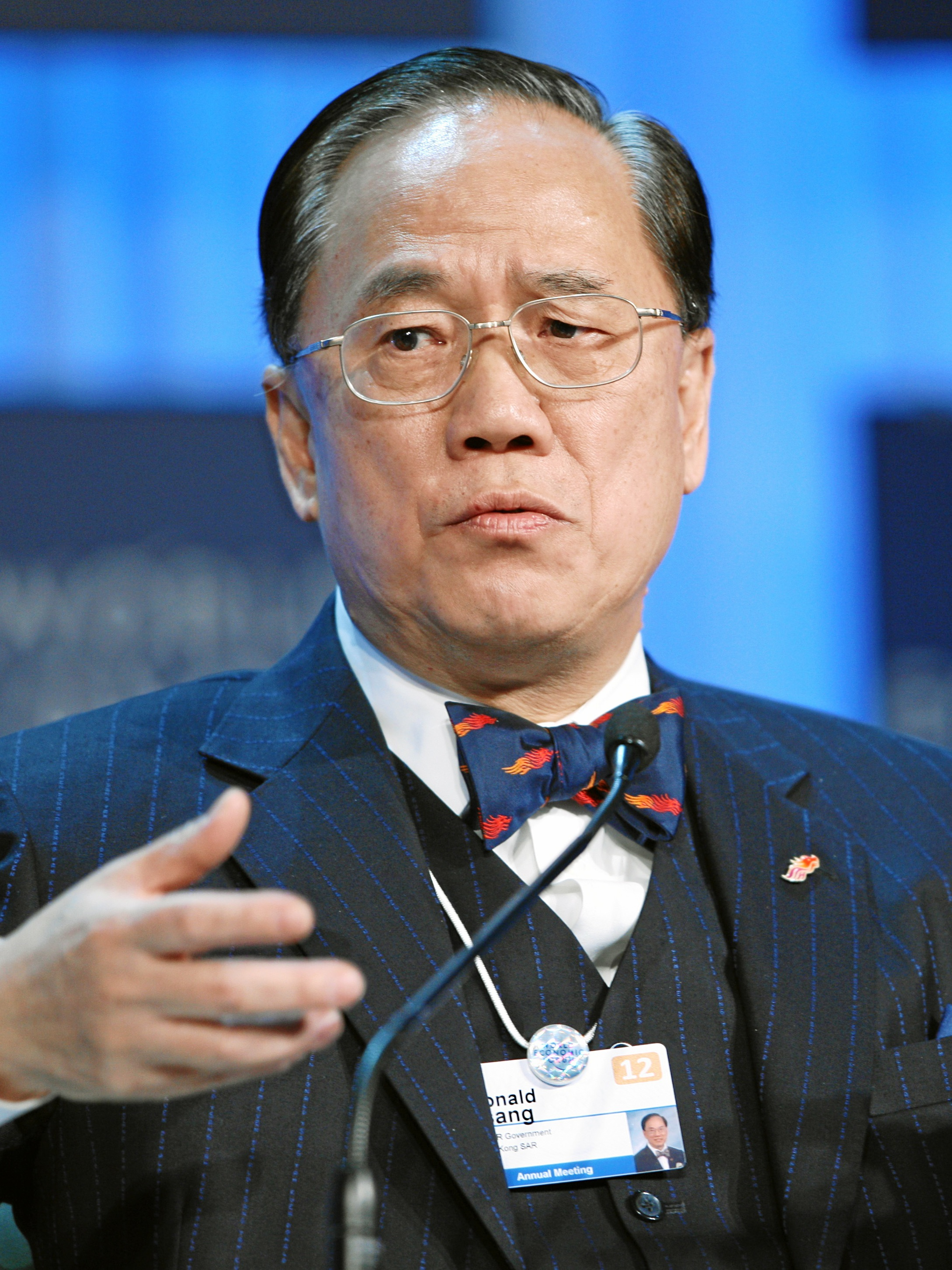
Sir Donald Tsang

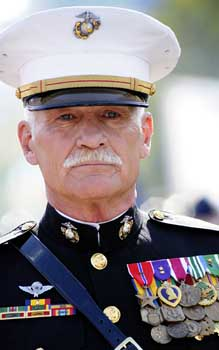
Dale Dye

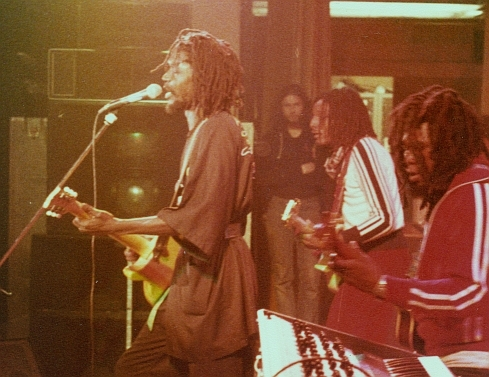
Peter Tosh

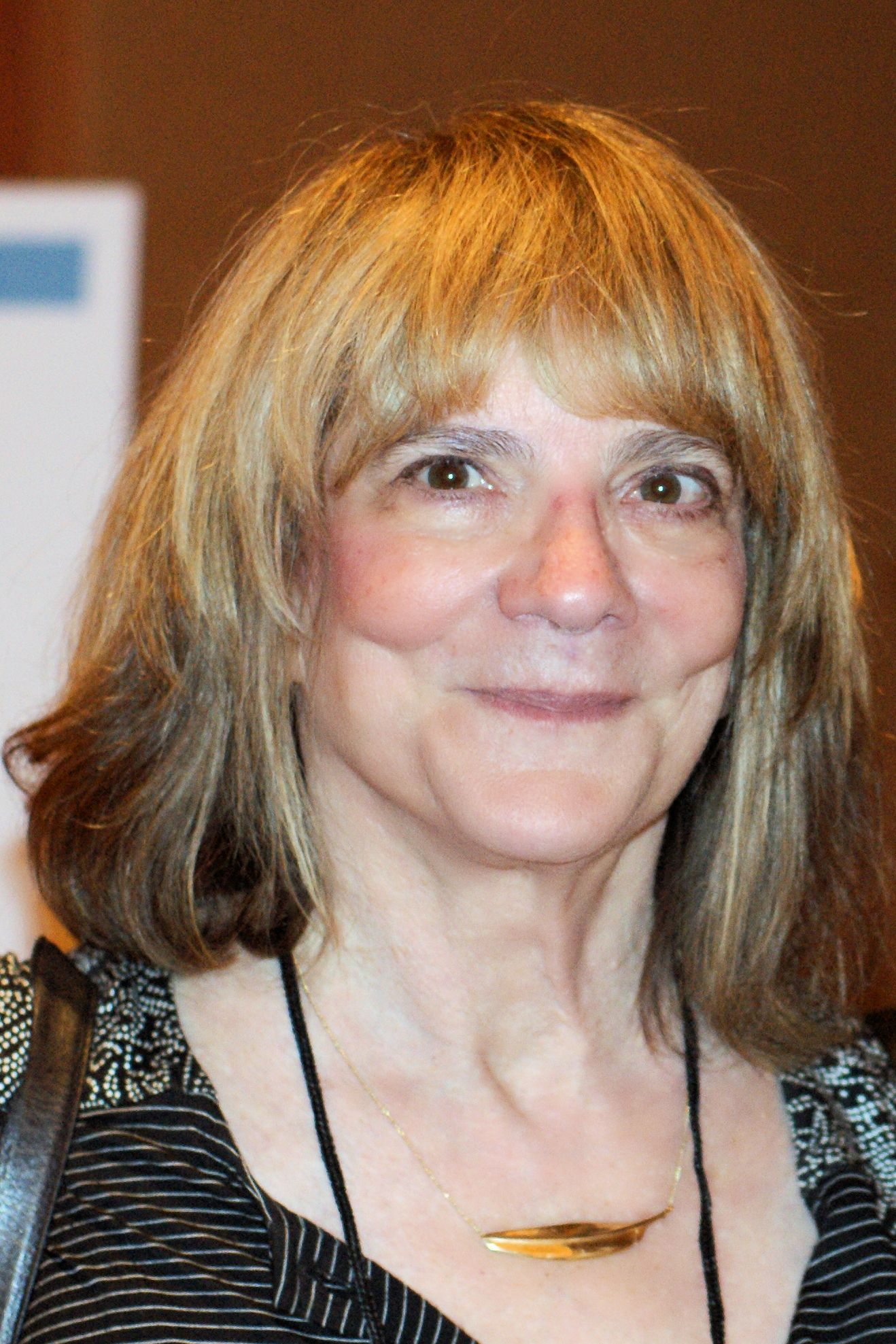
Elizabeth Loftus

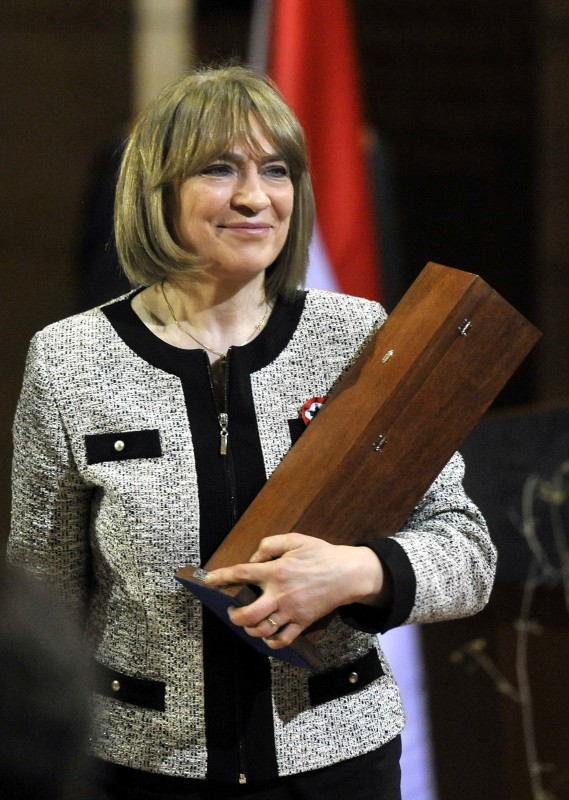
Kati Kovács

- October 1 – Ruth Adler, feminist, human rights campaigner and child welfare advocate (d.1994)
- October 2
  - Abdulah Sidran, Bosnian poet and screenwriter (d. 2024)
  - Vernor Vinge, American science fiction writer (d. 2024)
- October 3 – Pierre Deligne, Belgian mathematician
- October 4
  - Rocío Dúrcal, Spanish singer and actress (d. 2006)
  - Tony La Russa, American baseball player and manager
  - Eddie Gómez, Puerto Rican jazz double bassist
- October 5 – Arnhim Eustace, Vincentian politician and 3rd Prime Minister of Saint Vincent and the Grenadines
- October 6
  - Dhammananda Bhikkhuni, born Chatsumarn Kabilsingh, pioneering female Thai Buddhist monk, previously academic
  - Mylon LeFevre, American singer and evangelist (d. 2023)
  - Boris Mikhailov, former Russian ice hockey player
- October 7
  - Sir Donald Tsang, 2nd Chief Executive of Hong Kong
- October 8 – Dale Dye, American actor, technical advisor, radio personality and writer
- October 9
  - John Entwistle, English rock bass guitarist and singer-songwriter (The Who) (d. 2002)
  - Nona Hendryx, American R&B singer (Labelle)
- October 10 – Eurig Wyn, Welsh politician (d. 2019)
- October 11 – William T. Greenough, American neuroscientist (d. 2013)
- October 13
  - Margo Lion, American theatrical producer (d. 2020)
  - Gulab Chand Kataria, Indian politician and the 27th Governor of Assam
- October 14 – Udo Kier, German actor (d. 2025)
- October 15
  - Mac Collins, American politician (d. 2018)
  - Şerif Gören, Turkish film director
  - Haim Saban, Israeli-American media proprietor
  - David Trimble, Northern Irish Unionist political leader; recipient of the Nobel Peace Prize 1998 (d. 2022)
  - Kay Ivey, American politician
- October 16 – Elizabeth Loftus, American cognitive psychologist and memory specialist
- October 19 – George McCrae, American soul and disco singer
  - Peter Tosh, Jamaican singer and musician (d. 1987)
- October 20 – Clive Hornby, English actor (d. 2008)
- October 21
  - Janet Ahlberg, British children's book writer (d. 1994)
  - Muzaffar Ali, Indian filmmaker, fashion designer, poet, artist, cultural revivalist, and social worker
  - Jean-Pierre Sauvage, French scientist; recipient of the Nobel Prize in Chemistry 2016
- October 25
  - Jon Anderson, English rock singer-songwriter and musician
  - Ron Coote, Australian rugby league player
  - Kati Kovács, Hungarian jazz, pop and rock musician
  - Azizan Abdul Razak, Malaysian politician (d. 2013)
- October 27 – Nikolai Karachentsov, Russian actor (d. 2018)
- October 28
  - Dennis Franz, American actor
  - Marián Labuda, Slovak actor (d. 2018)
  - Ian Marter, English actor and writer (d. 1986)
  - Ranjit Mallick, Indian actor who works mainly in Bengali cinema
- October 30 – Ahmed Chalabi, Iraqi businessman and politician (d. 2015)
- October 31
  - Hal Wick, American politician (d. 2018)
  - Kinky Friedman, American singer, songwriter, novelist, humorist, politician and columnist

=== November ===
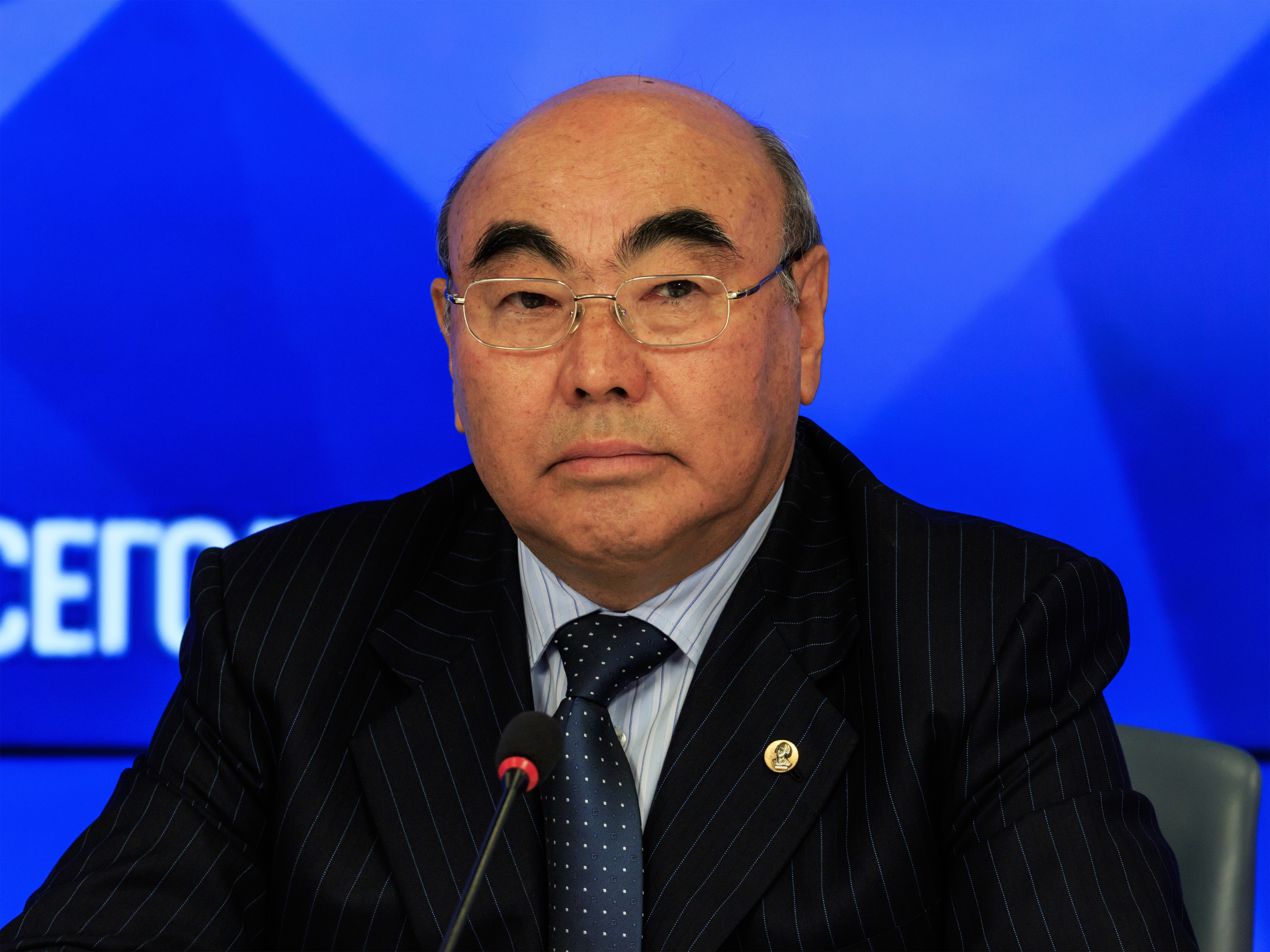
Askar Akayev

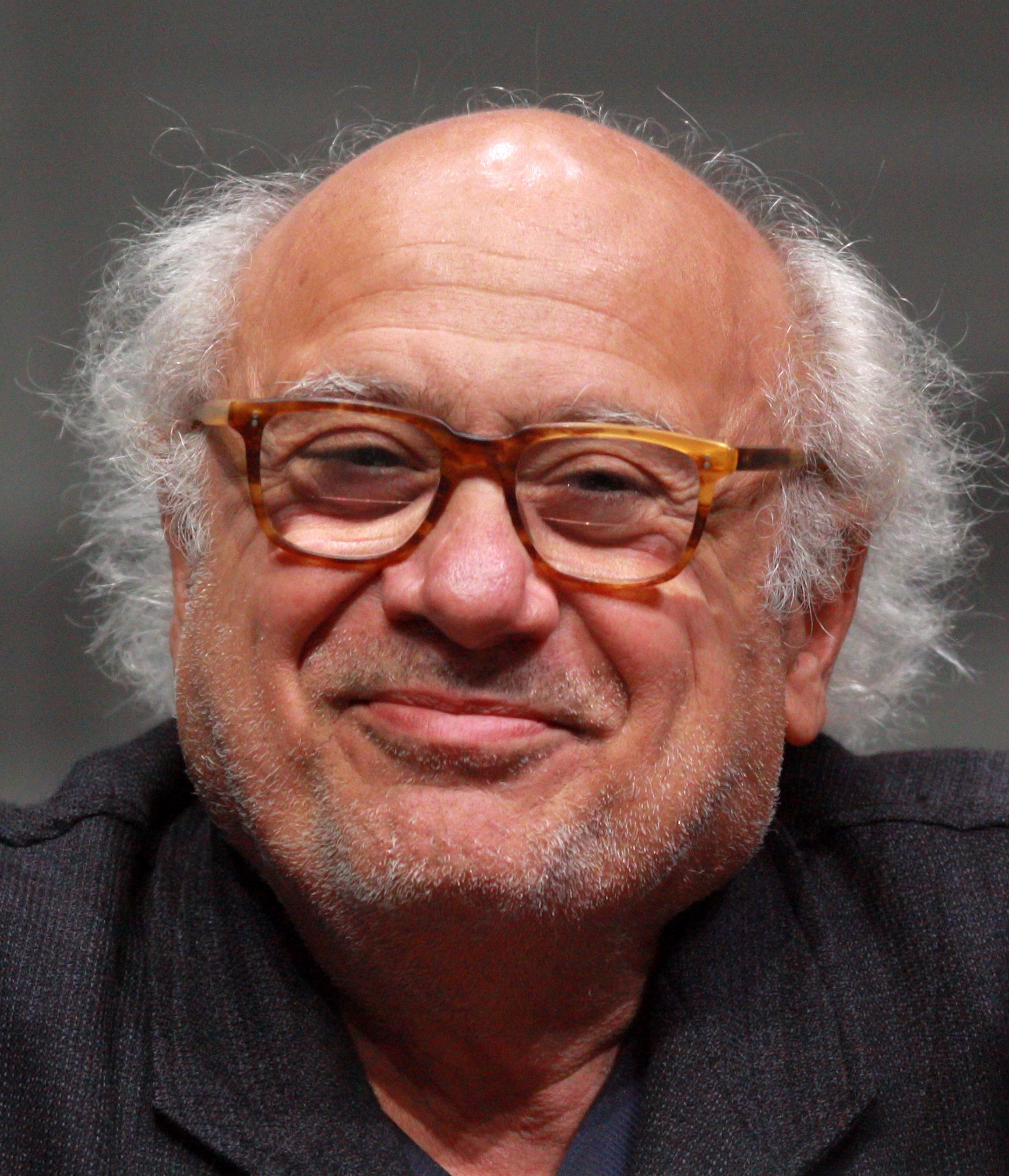
Danny DeVito

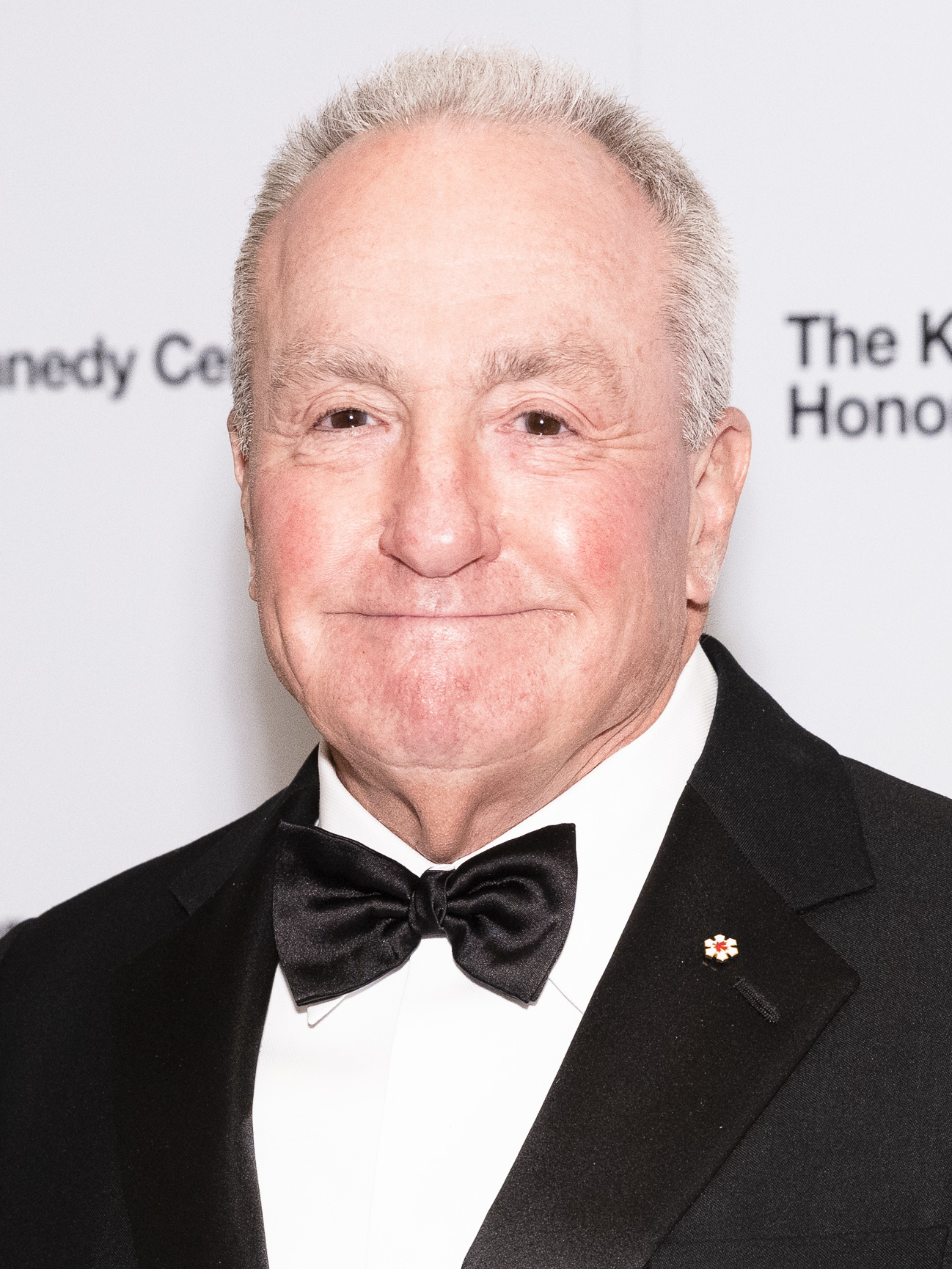
Lorne Michaels

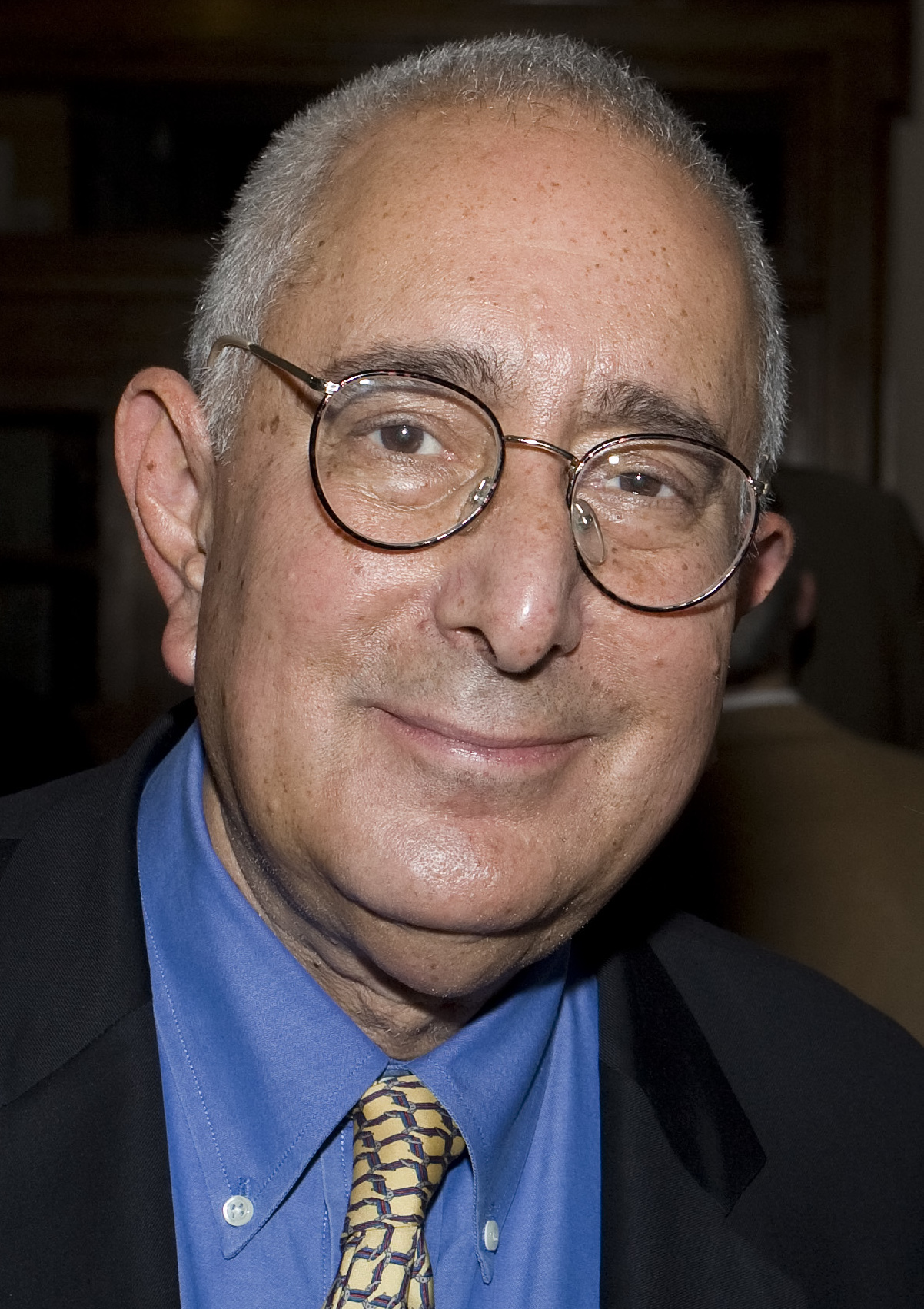
Ben Stein

- November 1
  - Rafic Hariri, 2-Time Prime Minister of Lebanon (d. 2005)
  - Bobby Heenan, American professional wrestling manager and commentator (d. 2017)
  - Oscar Temaru, President of French Polynesia
  - Florindo Fabrizio, American politician (d. 2018)
- November 2
  - Michael Buffer, American ring announcer and actor
  - Keith Emerson, English keyboardist (d. 2016)
- November 3 – Tom Shales, American writer and television critic (d. 2024)
- November 4
  - Linda Gary, American actress (d. 1995)
  - Willem Breuker, Dutch bandleader, composer, arranger, saxophonist, and clarinetist (d. 2010)
  - Scherrie Payne, American singer
- November 5 – Leland Wilkinson, American statistician and computer scientist (d. 2021)
- November 7
  - Luigi Riva, Italian footballer (d. 2024)
  - Joe Niekro, American baseball player (d. 2006)
- November 10
  - Askar Akayev, 1st President of Kyrgyzstan
  - Silvestre Reyes, American politician
  - Tim Rice, English lyricist, writer and broadcaster
- November 11 – Kemal Sunal, Turkish comedian
- November 12
  - Booker T. Jones, American R&B singer-songwriter, musician and producer
  - Al Michaels, American sportscaster
- November 14 – Karen Armstrong, British writer
- November 17
  - Jim Boeheim, American basketball player and coach
  - Malcolm Bruce, English-Scottish journalist, academic, and politician
  - Gene Clark, American singer-songwriter (d. 1991)
  - Danny DeVito, American actor, film producer and director
  - Gary Goldman, American animator, film producer and director
  - Rem Koolhaas, Dutch architect
  - Lorne Michaels, Canadian television and film producer
  - Tom Seaver, American baseball pitcher (d. 2020)
  - Sammy Younge Jr., American civil rights activist (d. 1966)
- November 18
  - Wolfgang Joop, German artist, fashion designer and art collector
  - Ed Krupp, American astronomer, director of the Griffith Observatory
  - Lorinda Cherry, American computer scientist (d. 2022)
- November 20
  - Louie Dampier, American basketball player
  - Donald DiFrancesco, American lawyer and politician, 51st Governor of New Jersey
- November 21
  - Dick Durbin, American politician
  - Earl Monroe, American basketball player
  - Harold Ramis, American actor, director and comedy writer (d. 2014)
- November 23 – Peter Lindbergh, German fashion photographer and film director (d. 2019)
- November 24
  - Candy Darling, American actress (d. 1974)
  - Ibrahim Gambari, Nigerian scholar and diplomat
  - Amol Palekar, Indian actor, director and producer of Hindi and Marathi cinema
- November 25
  - Ben Stein, American law professor, actor and author
  - Michael Kijana Wamalwa, Kenyan politician, 8th Vice President of Kenya
  - Sylvia Gore, English footballer (d. 2016)
- November 27 – Mickey Leland, American politician (d. 1989)
- November 28 – Rita Mae Brown, American fiction writer and political activist
- November 30 – George Graham, Scottish football player and manager

=== December ===
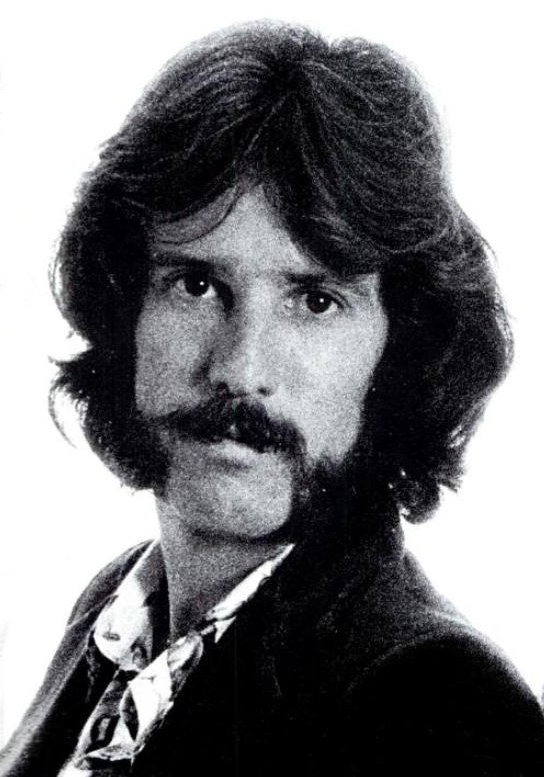
John Densmore

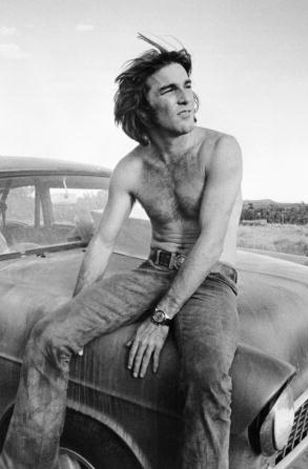
Dennis Wilson

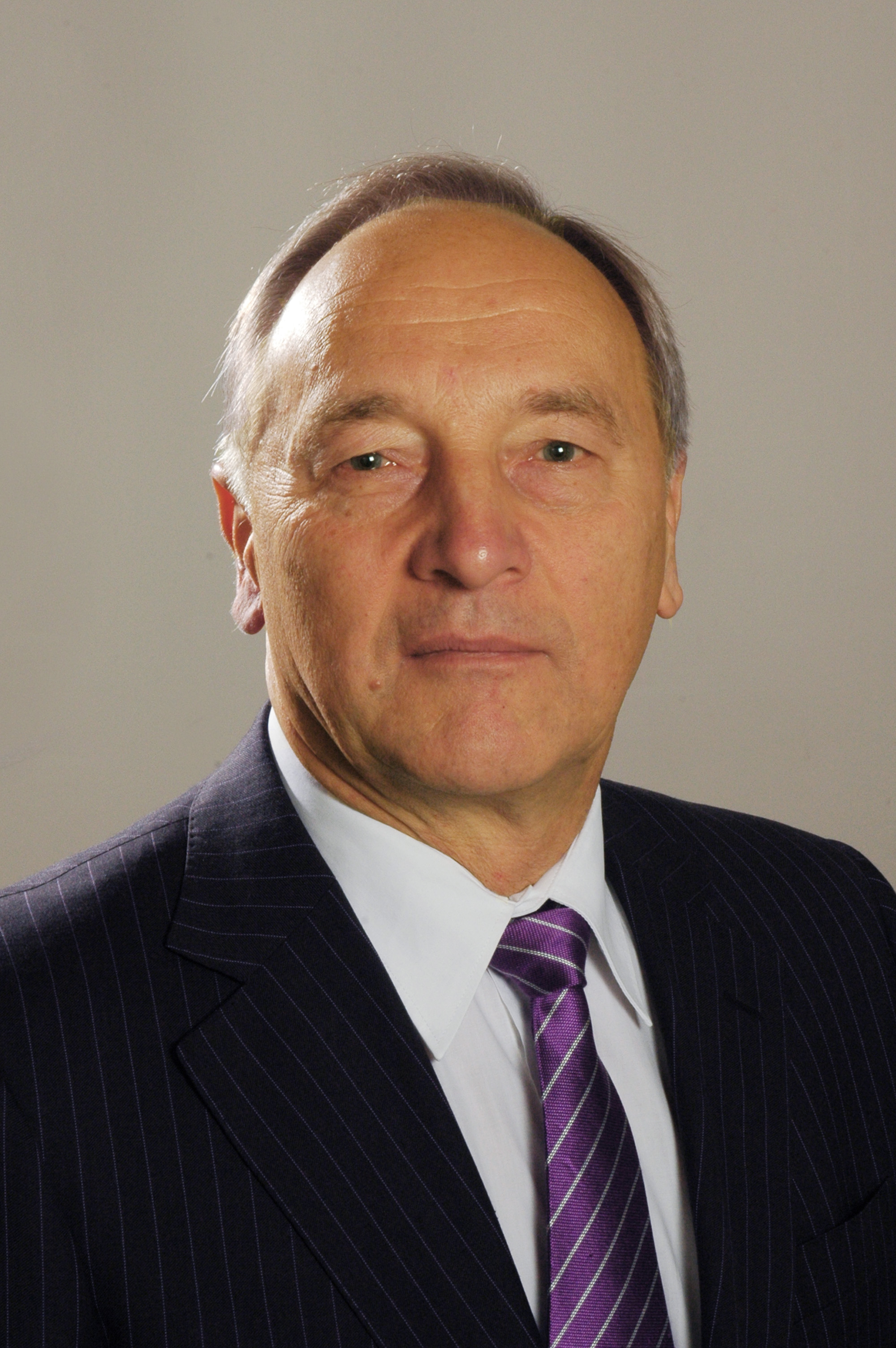
Andris Bērziņš

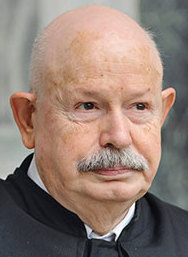
Giacomo dalla Torre

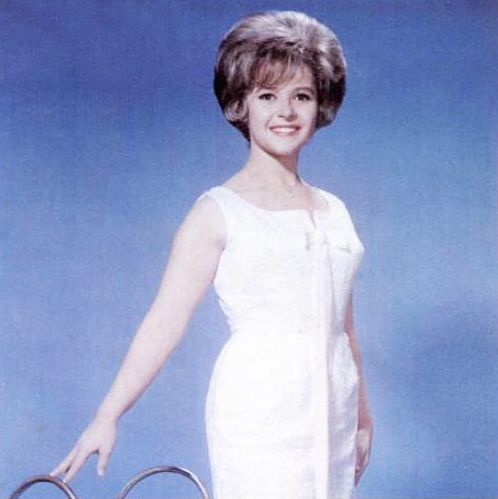
Brenda Lee

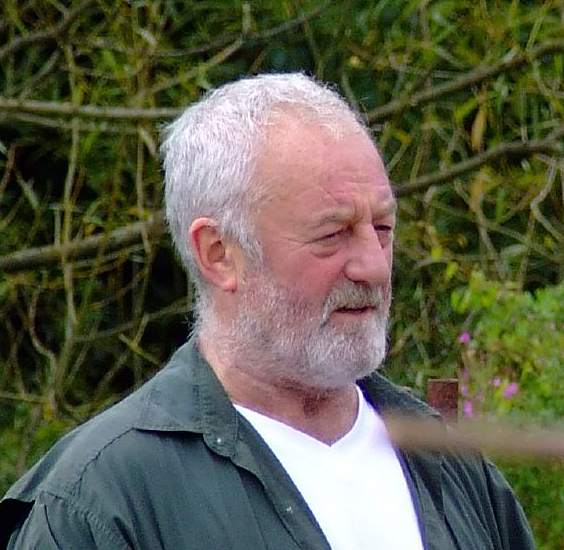
Bernard Hill

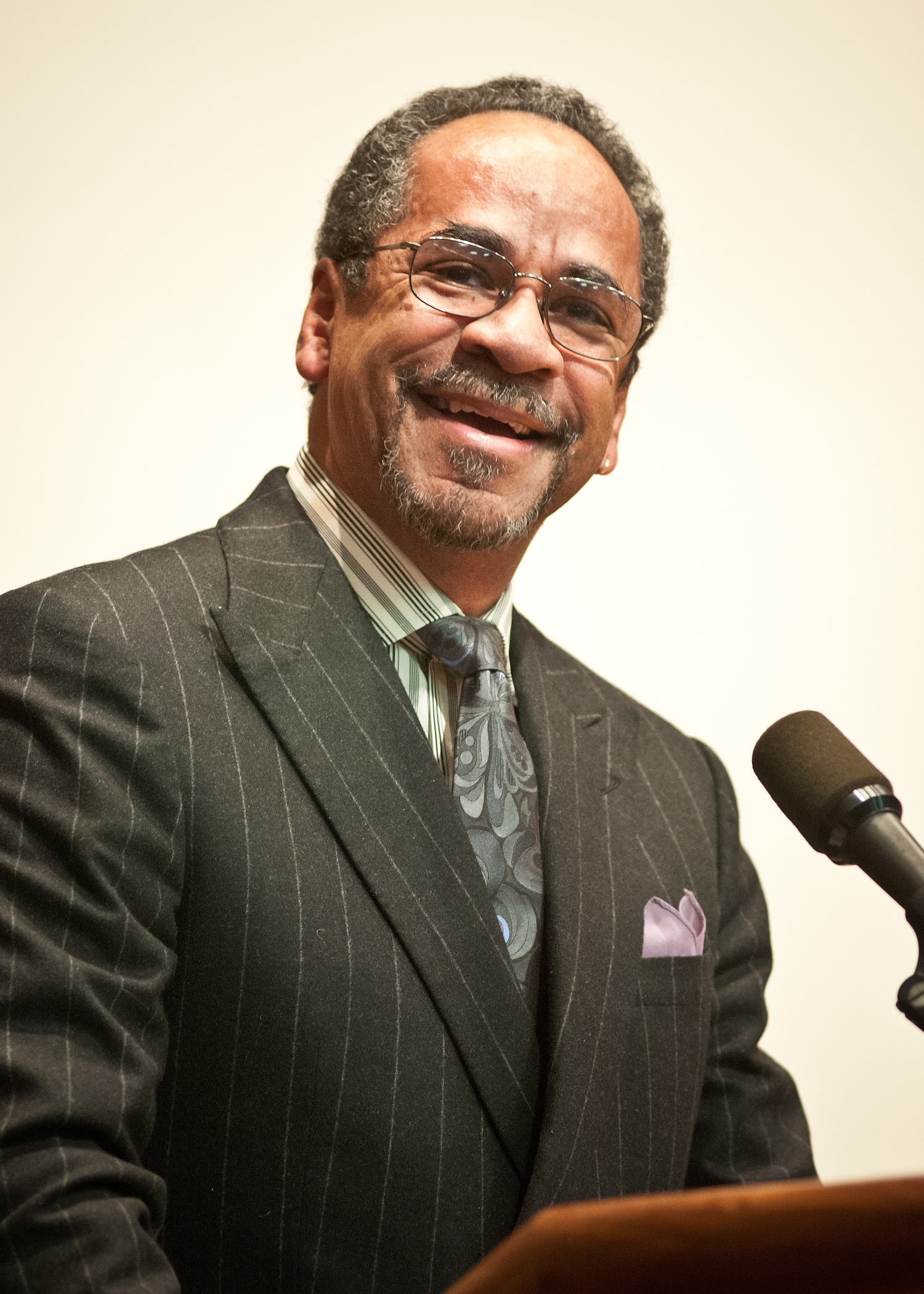
Tim Reid

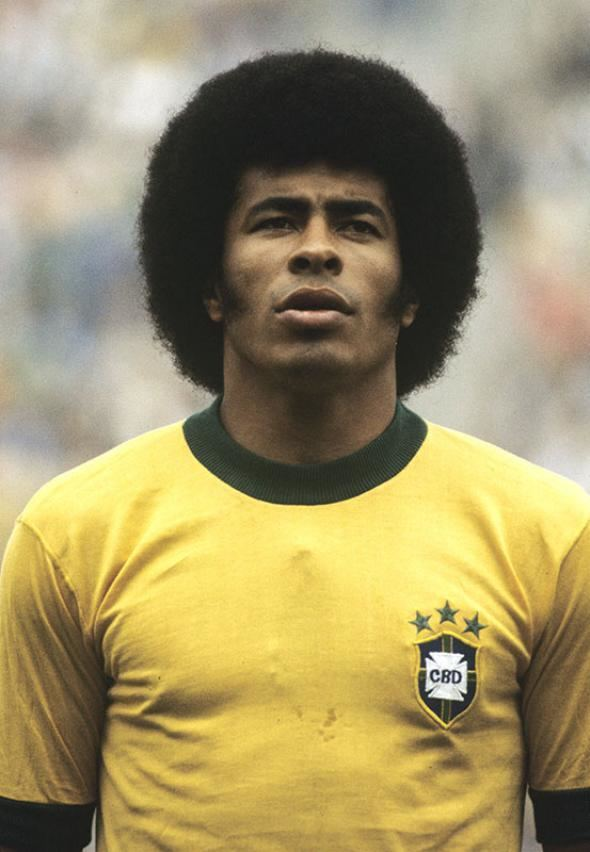
Jairzinho

- December 1 – John Densmore, drummer, member of The Doors.
- December 2
  - Cathy Lee Crosby, American actress (That's Incredible!)
  - Ibrahim Rugova, 1st President of Kosovo (d. 2006)
  - Dionysis Savvopoulos, Greek singer-songwriter
- December 3 – Ralph McTell, English folk singer-songwriter
- December 4
  - Dennis Wilson, American pop singer-songwriter and drummer (d. 1983)
  - Chris Hillman, American musician and bassist
- December 5 – Jeroen Krabbé, Dutch actor and film director
- December 6
  - Kit Culkin, American stage actor
  - Ron Kenoly, American Christian leader
  - Sutiyoso, Indonesian politician and general, governor of Jakarta
  - Jonathan King, English music producer and convicted sex offender
- December 7
  - Daniel Chorzempa, American organist
  - Georges Coste, French rugby player and coach
- December 8
  - George Baker, Dutch singer-songwriter
  - Sharmila Tagore, Indian actress and model
- December 9
  - Giacomo dalla Torre del Tempio di Sanguinetto, 80th Prince and Grand Master of the Sovereign Military Order of Malta (d. 2020)
  - Tadashi Irie, Japanese yakuza boss
  - Ki Longfellow, American novelist
  - Neil Innes, English writer, comedian and musician (d. 2019)
  - Roger Short, British diplomat (murdered in the 2003 Istanbul bombings)
- December 10
  - Andris Bērziņš, 8th President of Latvia
  - Bhikkhu Bodhi, American Theravada Buddhist monk
- December 11
  - Gianni Morandi, Italian singer
  - Brenda Lee, American singer
  - Lynda Day George, American actress
  - Teri Garr, American actress (d. 2024)
- December 12
  - Diana Bracho, Mexican actress
  - Kenneth Cranham, Scottish born actor
  - Cara Duff-MacCormick, Canadian stage actress
  - Alex Acuña, Peruvian–American jazz drummer and percussionist
- December 14 – Denis Thwaites, English footballer (murdered in the 2015 Sousse attacks)
- December 15 – Chico Mendes, Brazilian rubber tapper, trade union leader and environmentalist (d.1988)
- December 16 – Sein Win, Burmese politician
- December 17 – Bernard Hill, British actor (d. 2024)
- December 19
  - Mitchell Feigenbaum, American mathematical physicist (d. 2019)
  - María Martha Serra Lima, Argentine singer (d. 2017)
  - Tim Reid, African-American actor and film director
  - Anastasiya Vertinskaya, Soviet and Russian actress
  - Terry Underwood, Australian author
  - Fred Callaghan, English footballer (d. 2022)
  - Douglas Durst, American real estate investor and developer
  - Alvin Lee, English guitarist, singer and songwriter (d. 2013)
  - William Christie, American-born French conductor and musician
- December 20
  - Ray Martin, Australian journalist and television presenter
  - Bobby Colomby, American drummer and producer
  - Anton Rippon, British journalist and author
- December 21
  - Bill Atkinson, English footballer (d. 2013)
  - Michael Tilson Thomas, American conductor (d. 2026)
  - Zheng Xiaoyu, Chinese bureaucrat (d. 2007)
- December 22
  - Steve Carlton, American baseball player
  - Mo Foster, English multi-instrumentalist, record producer, composer, solo artist, author, and public speaker (d. 2023)
- December 23
  - Wesley Clark, U.S. general and NATO Supreme Allied Commander
  - Ingar Knudtsen, Norwegian novelist and poet
- December 24
  - Erhard Keller, German speed skater
  - Mick Shoebottom, English rugby league player (d. 2002)
- December 25
  - Jairzinho, Brazilian football player
  - Kenny Everett, British comedian and radio DJ. (d. 1995)
- December 26
  - Bill Ayers, American education theorist, previously radical anti-war activist
  - Jane Lapotaire, British actress (d. 2026)
  - Aleksey Mikhalyov, Russian translator
- December 27 – Mick Jones, English rock guitarist, singer-songwriter and producer (Foreigner)
- December 28
  - Kary Mullis, American chemist, Nobel Prize laureate (d. 2019)
  - Edgar Vivar, Mexican actor (Señor Barriga and Ñoño in El Chavo del Ocho)
  - Johnny Isakson, American politician (d. 2021)
- December 30 – Joseph Hilbe, American statistician and author (d. 2017)
- December 31
  - Neil Ross, British-American voice actor and announcer
  - Jan Widströmer, Swedish painter and poet
  - Lois Galgay Reckitt, American activist and politician (d. 2023)

=== Date unknown ===
- Lea Hopkins, American LGBT rights activist from Missouri
- Donald Nicolaisen, American SEC chief accountant (d. 2019)

== Deaths ==
=== January ===
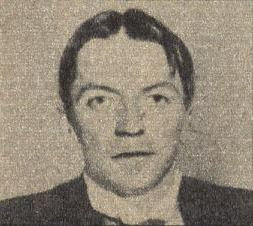
Kaj Munk

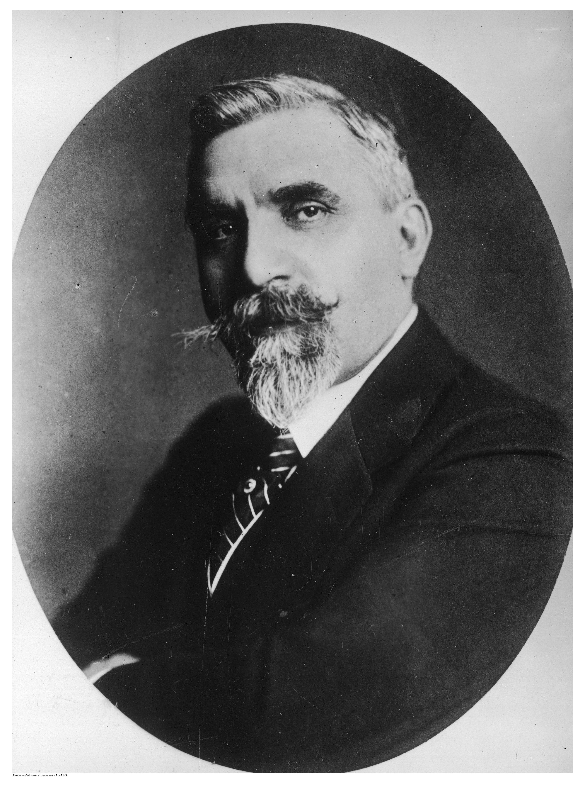
Andrey Toshev

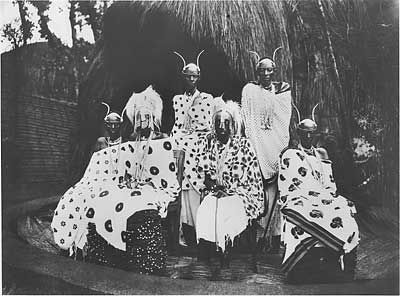
Yuhi V Musinga

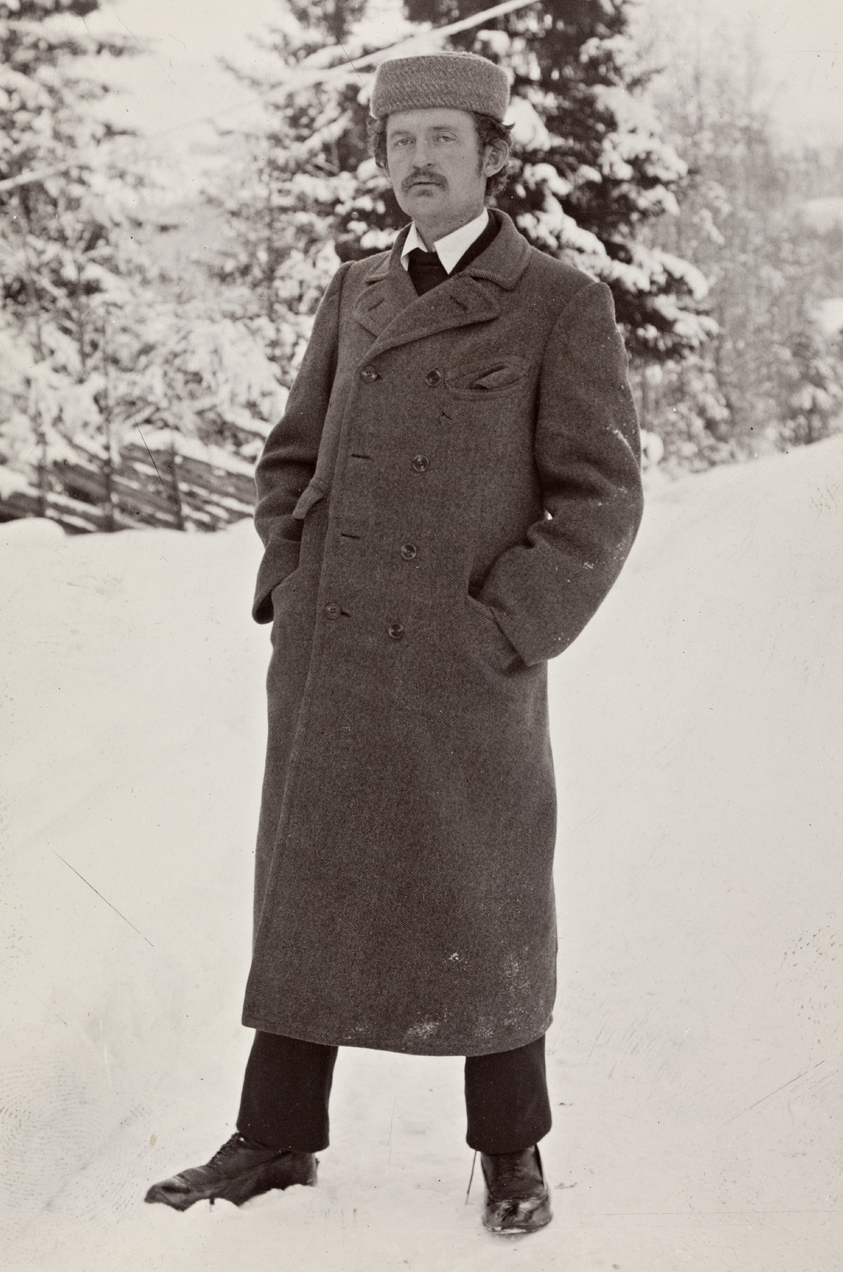
Edvard Munch

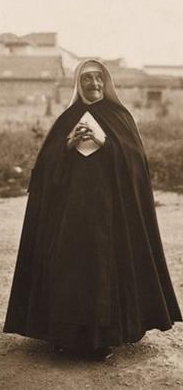
Blessed Teresa Grillo Michel

- January 1
  - Sir Edwin Lutyens, British architect (b. 1869)
  - Charles Turner, Australian cricketer (b. 1862)
- January 3 – Franz Reichleitner, Austrian SS officer and Nazi concentration camp commandant (b. 1906)
- January 4
  - Kaj Munk, Danish playwright, Lutheran pastor and martyr (b. 1898)
  - Jean Tatlock, American psychiatrist (b. 1914)
- January 6 – Ida Tarbell, American journalist and muckraker (b. 1857)
- January 7 – Lou Henry Hoover, First Lady of the United States (b. 1874)
- January 9 – Antanas Smetona, president of Lithuania (b. 1874)
- January 10
  - William Emerson Ritter, American biologist (b. 1856)
  - Andrey Toshev, Bulgarian scientist and diplomat, 26th Prime Minister of Bulgaria (b. 1867)
- January 11
  - Italian leaders of the Grand Council of Fascism executed following the Verona Trial
    - Emilio De Bono, general (b. 1866)
    - Galeazzo Ciano, aristocrat and diplomat (b. 1903)
    - Giovanni Marinelli, politician (b. 1879)
  - Charles King, American actor (b. 1889)
  - Edgard Potier, Belgian spy (suicide) (b. 1903)
- January 12
  - Nicholas Bunkerd Kitbamrung, Thai Roman Catholic priest and blessed (b. 1895)
  - Juliette Atkinson, American tennis champion (b. 1873)
- January 13 – King Yuhi V of Rwanda (b. 1883)
- January 14 – Mehmet Emin Yurdakul, Turkish writer (b. 1869)
- January 18 – Léon Brunschvicg, French philosopher (b. 1869)
- January 20 – James McKeen Cattell, American psychologist (b. 1860)
- January 21
  - Yoshimi Nishida, Japanese general (b. 1892)
  - Heinrich Prinz zu Sayn-Wittgenstein, German night fighter pilot and flying ace (b. 1916)
- January 23 – Edvard Munch, Norwegian painter (b. 1863)
- January 25 – Teresa Grillo Michel, Italian Roman Catholic nun and blessed (b. 1855)
- January 29 – William Allen White, American journalist (b. 1868)
- January 31 – Jean Giraudoux, French writer (b. 1882)

=== February ===
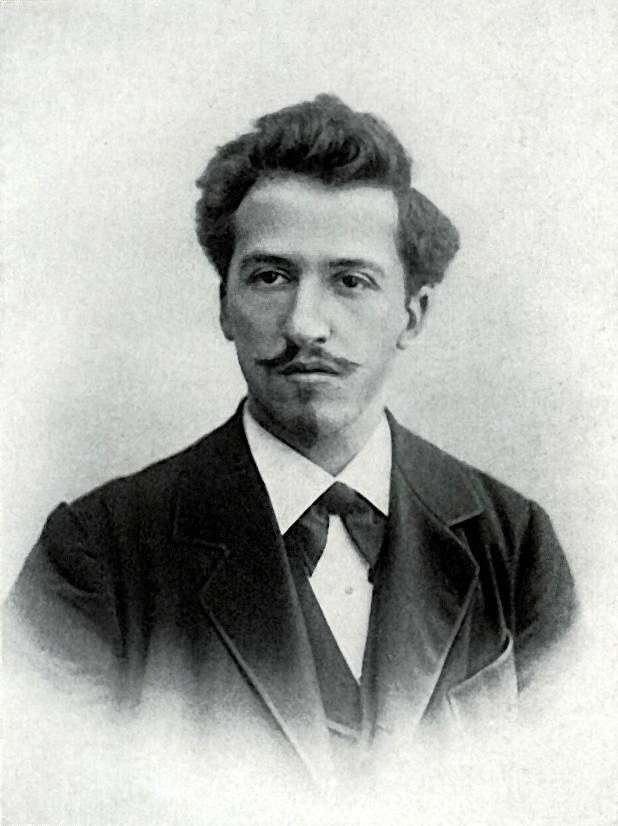
Piet Mondrian

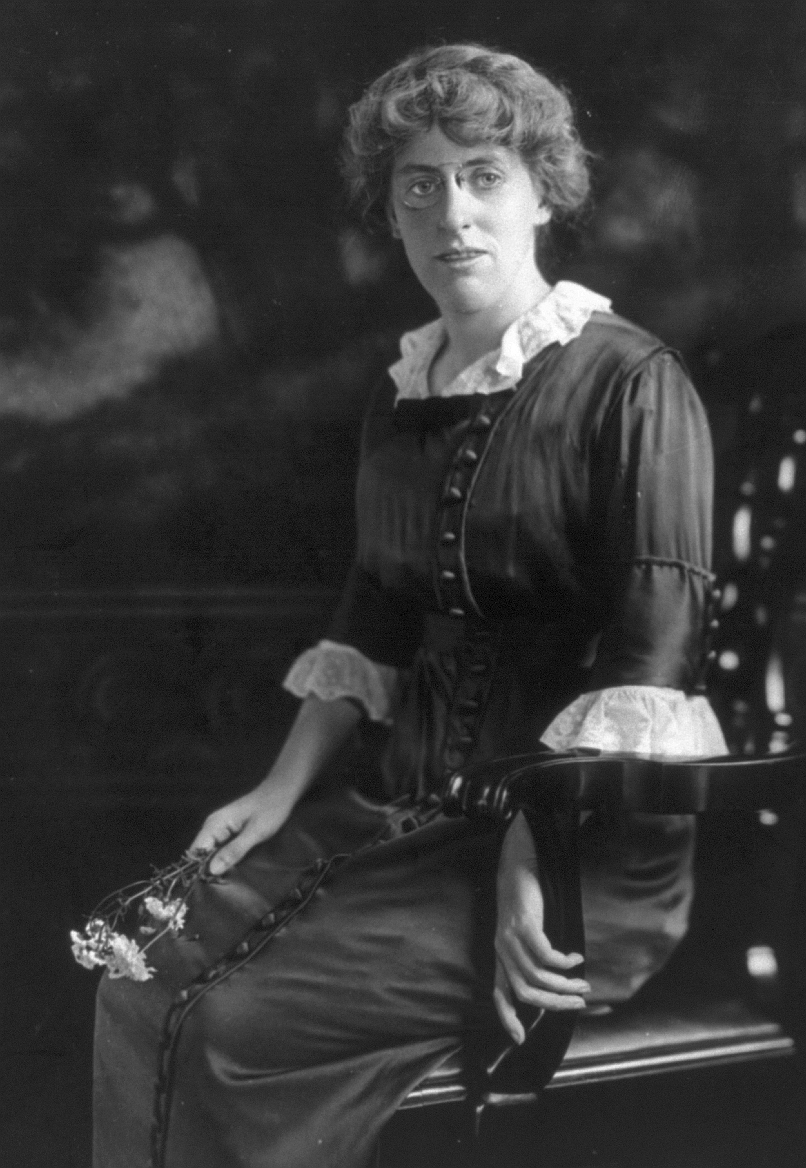
Margaret Woodrow Wilson

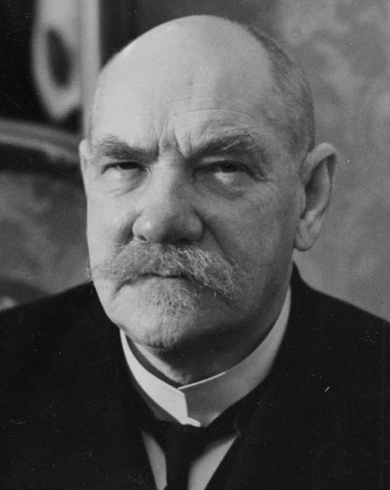
Pehr Evind Svinhufvud

- February 1 – Piet Mondrian, Dutch painter (b. 1872)
- February 3 – Yvette Guilbert, French singer and actress (b. 1867)
- February 7 – Robert E. Park, American sociologist (b. 1864)
- February 9 – Agnes Mary Frances Duclaux, British poet, essayist and novelist (b. 1857)
- February 11 – Carl Meinhof, German linguist (b. 1857)
- February 12
  - Kenneth Gandar-Dower, English sportsman, aviator, explorer and author (b. 1908)
  - Margaret Woodrow Wilson, American singer; Presidential daughter (b. 1886)
- February 13 – Edgar Selwyn, American screenwriter (b. 1875)
- February 16
  - Carl August Ehrensvärd, Swedish admiral (b. 1858)
  - Henri Nathansen, Danish writer and director (b. 1868)
- February 17 – Valentin Kotyk, partisan scout, the youngest-ever Hero of Soviet Union (killed in action) (b. 1930)
- February 18 – David Griffin, Royal Canadian Air Force flying officer, Olympic athlete, and journalist (b. 1905)
- February 21 – Ferenc Szisz, Hungarian-born race car driver (b. 1873)
- February 23 – Leo Baekeland, Belgian-born American chemist (b. 1863)
- February 24 – Fanny Clar, French journalist and writer (b. 1875)
- February 29 – Pehr Evind Svinhufvud, Finnish politician, 1st Prime Minister and 3rd President of Finland (b. 1861)

=== March ===
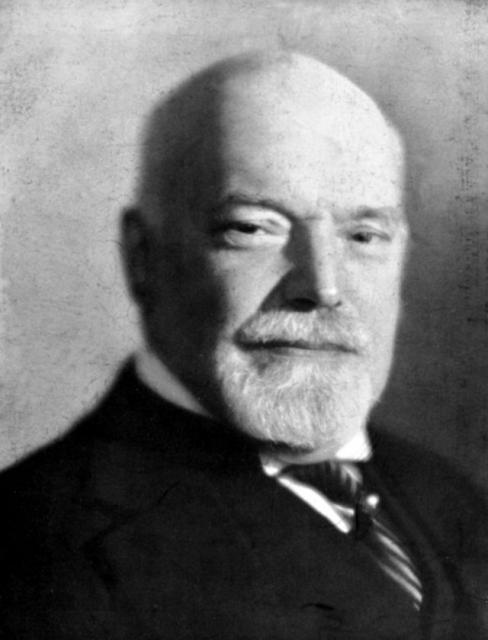
Paul-Émile Janson

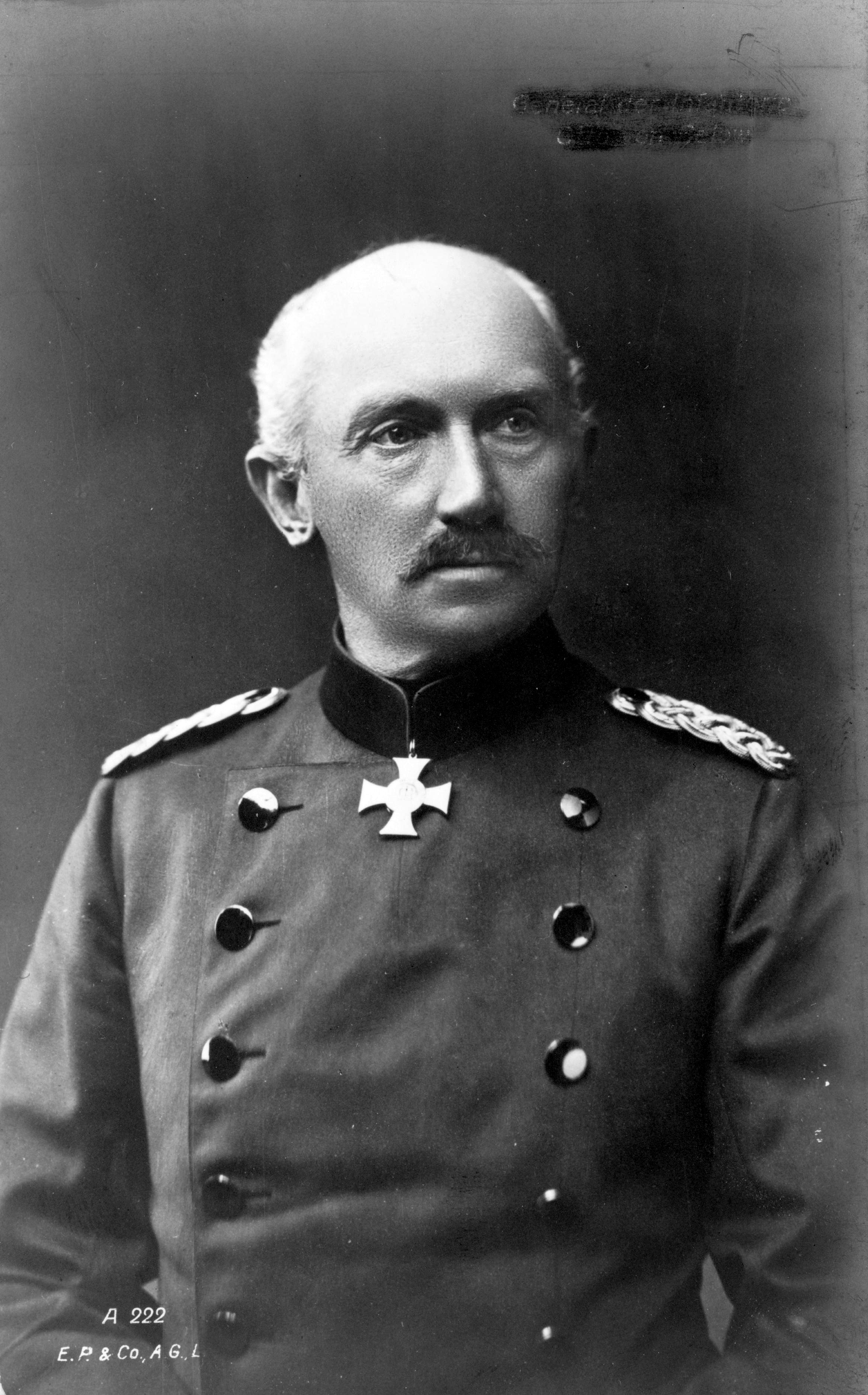
Otto von Below

- March 3 – Paul-Émile Janson, Belgian politician, 30th Prime Minister of Belgium (b. 1872)
- March 4 – Louis Buchalter, Jewish-born American mobster, head of Murder, Inc. (executed) (b. 1897)
- March 5
  - Max Jacob, French poet (b. 1876)
  - Neel E. Kearby, American fighter ace (killed in action) (b. 1911)
- March 8
  - Edmée Chandon, first professional female astronomer in France, first woman in France to earn a doctorat d'État in mathematics. (b. 1885)
  - Xu Zonghan, Chinese medical doctor, politician and revolutionary (b. 1877)
- March 9 – Demetrios Capetanakis, Greek poet, essayist and critic (b. 1912)
- March 11
  - Hendrik Willem van Loon, Dutch-born American historian, journalist and writer (b. 1882)
  - Irvin S. Cobb, American writer (b. 1876)
- March 15
  - Otto von Below, German general (b. 1857)
  - Mariya Oktyabrskaya, Soviet national hero (b. 1905)
- March 17 – Mario Bravo, Argentinian politician and writer (b. 1882)
- March 19
  - Giuseppe de Liguoro, Italian actor and director (b. 1869)
  - Noël Édouard, vicomte de Curières de Castelnau, French general (b. 1851)
- March 22 – Pierre Brossolette, journalist and French Resistance fighter (b. 1903)
- March 23 – Myron Selznick, American film producer (b. 1898)
- March 24
  - Pietro Pappagallo, Italian Roman Catholic priest and blessed (b. 1888)
  - Orde Wingate, British soldier (b. 1903)
- March 25 – Omelyan Kovch, Soviet Roman Catholic and Greek Orthodox priest, martyr and blessed (b. 1884)
- March 28 – Stephen Leacock, British-born Canadian humorist, author and economist (b. 1869)
- March 31
  - Antoni Kiewnarski, Polish WWII hero (b. 1899)
  - Mineichi Koga, Japanese admiral (b. 1885)
  - Włodzimierz Kolanowski, Polish army officer (b. 1913)

=== April ===
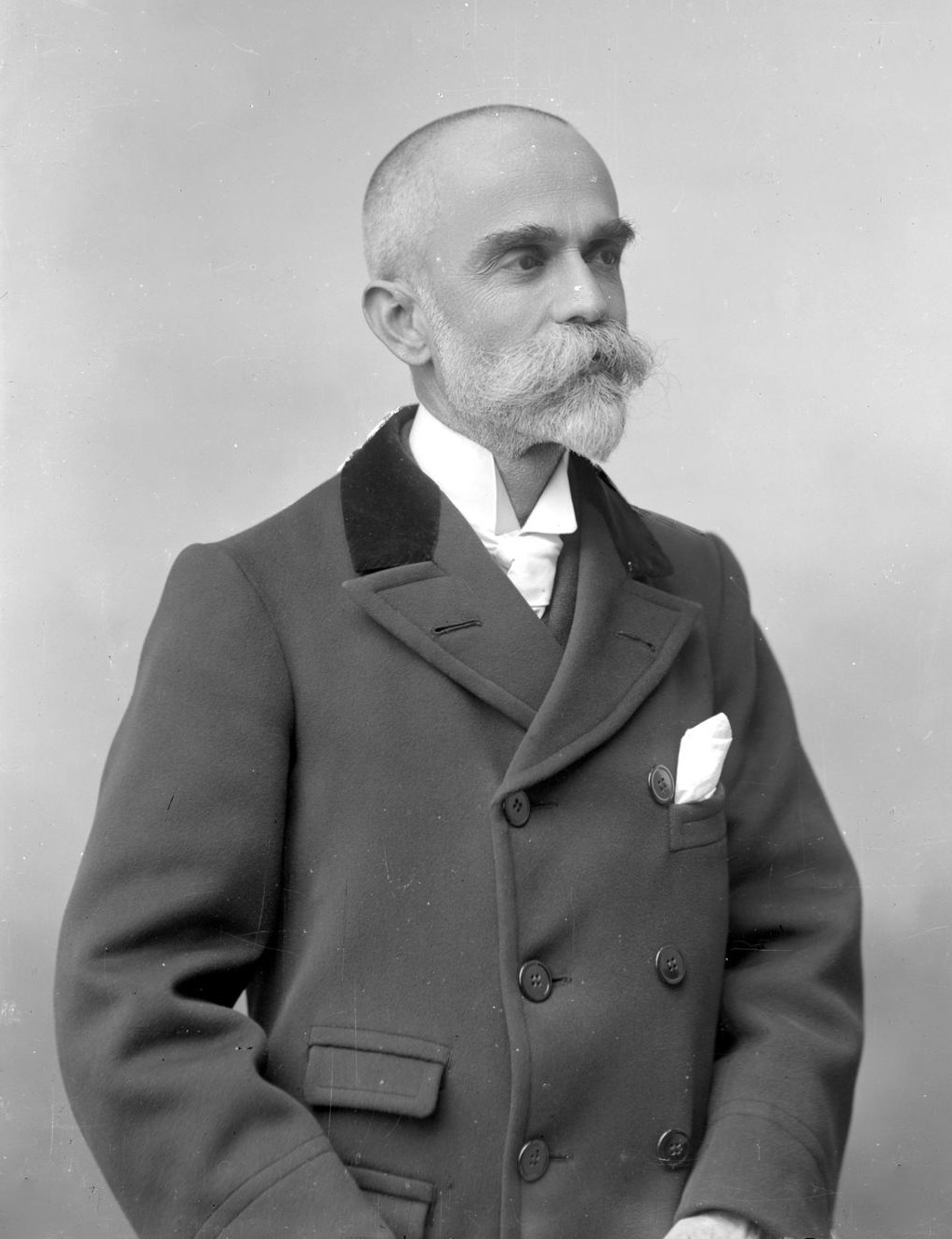
Bernardino Machado

- April 1 – Sharifzyan Kazanbaev, Soviet army officer (b. 1916)
- April 2 – John Batchelor, British missionary and reverend (b. 1855)
- April 9 – Yevgeniya Rudneva, Soviet WWII heroine (b. 1920)
- April 13 – Bartolomeo Gosio, Italian scientist (b. 1863)
- April 15
  - Giovanni Gentile, Italian philosopher and Fascist politician (assassinated) (b. 1875)
  - Nikolai Vatutin, Soviet military commander, commander of the 1st Ukrainian Front, Hero of the Soviet Union (b. 1901)
- April 17 – J. T. Hearne, English cricketer (b. 1867)
- April 21 – Hans-Valentin Hube, German army general (b. 1890)
- April 24 – Charles Jordan, American magician (b. 1888)
- April 25 – George Herriman, American cartoonist (b. 1880)
- April 28
  - Mohammed Alim Khan, Emir of Bukhara (b. 1880)
  - Frank Knox, American Secretary of the Navy during WWII (b. 1874)
- April 29
  - Billy Bitzer, American cinematographer (b. 1874)
  - Bernardino Machado, Portuguese political figure, 2-time Prime Minister of Portugal and 2-time President of Portugal, leader of the World War I (b. 1851)
- April 30 – Paul Poiret, French couturier (b. 1879)

=== May ===
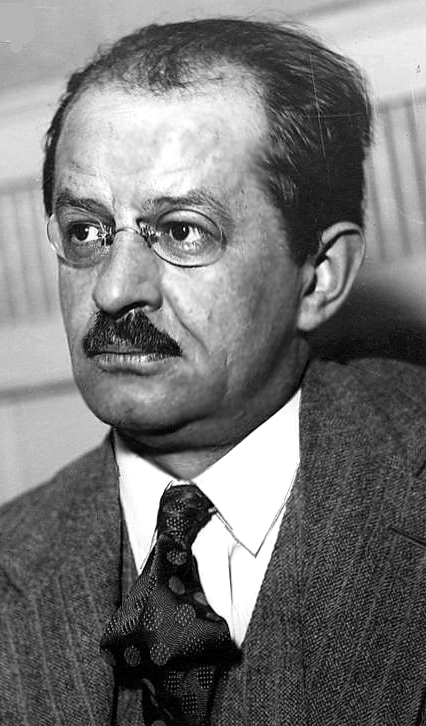
Leon Kozłowski

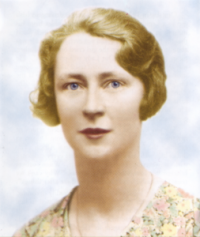
Edel Quinn

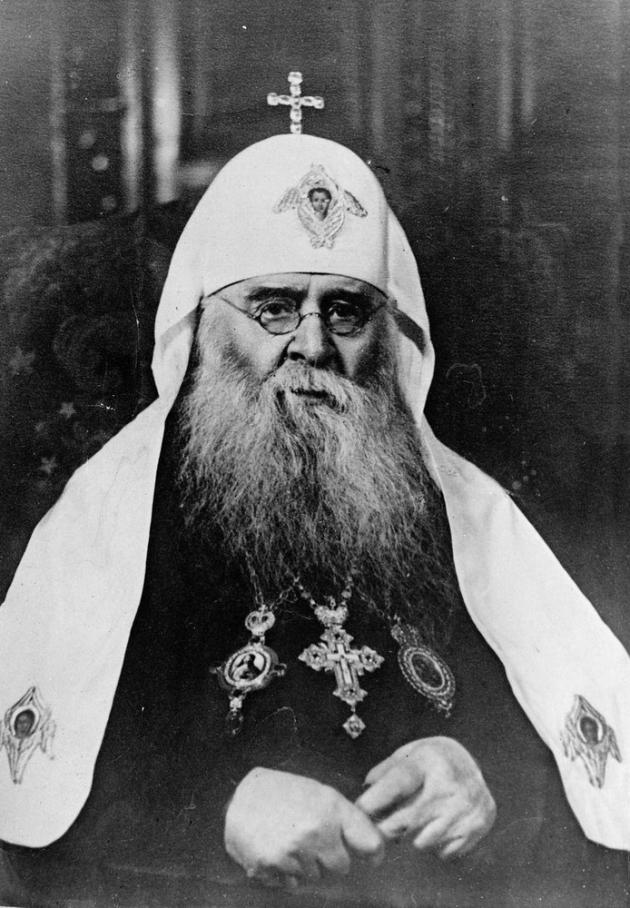
Patriarch Sergius of Moscow

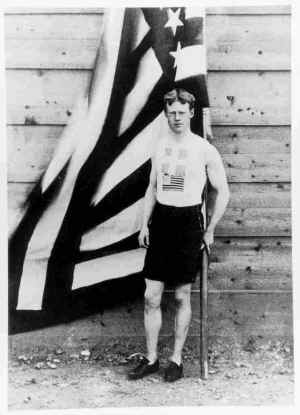
Thomas Curtis

- May 5 – Bertha Benz, German automotive pioneer, wife and business partner of automobile inventor Karl Benz (b. 1849)
- May 7 – William Ledyard Rodgers, American admiral and military and naval historian (b. 1860)
- May 11 – Leon Kozłowski, Polish archaeologist and politician, 25th Prime Minister of Poland (b. 1892)
- May 12
  - Max Brand, American author (b. 1892)
  - Harold Lowe, British sailor, 5th officer of the RMS Titanic (b. 1882)
  - Arthur Quiller-Couch, British writer and academic (b. 1863)
  - Edel Quinn, Irish Roman Catholic laywoman, missionary and venerable (b. 1907)
- May 15 – Patriarch Sergius I (b. 1867)
- May 16
  - George Ade, American author (b. 1866)
  - Filip Mișea, Aromanian activist, physician and politician (b. 1873)
- May 17 – Milena Jesenská, Czech journalist, writer, editor and translator (b. 1896)
- May 20
  - Fraser Barron, New Zealand bomber pilot during WWII (b. 1921)
  - Eugenio Colorni, Italian philosopher and activist (b. 1909)
  - Vincent Rose, American musician and band leader (b. 1880)
- May 21
  - Edmund Mortimer, American actor and director (b. 1874)
  - Li Jiayu, Chinese general of the National Revolutionary Army (b. 1892)
- May 23 – Thomas Curtis, American Olympic athlete (b. 1873)
- May 24
  - Inigo Campioni, Italian admiral (executed) (b. 1878)
  - Matsuji Ijuin, Japanese admiral (killed in action) (b. 1893)
  - Luigi Mascherpa, Italian admiral (executed) (b. 1893)
  - Harold Bell Wright, American writer (b. 1872)
- May 25 – Clark Daniel Stearns, 9th Governor of American Samoa (b. 1870)
- May 30
  - Patriarch Mesrob I Naroyan of Constantinople (b. 1875)
  - Jessie Ralph, American actress (b. 1864)

=== June ===
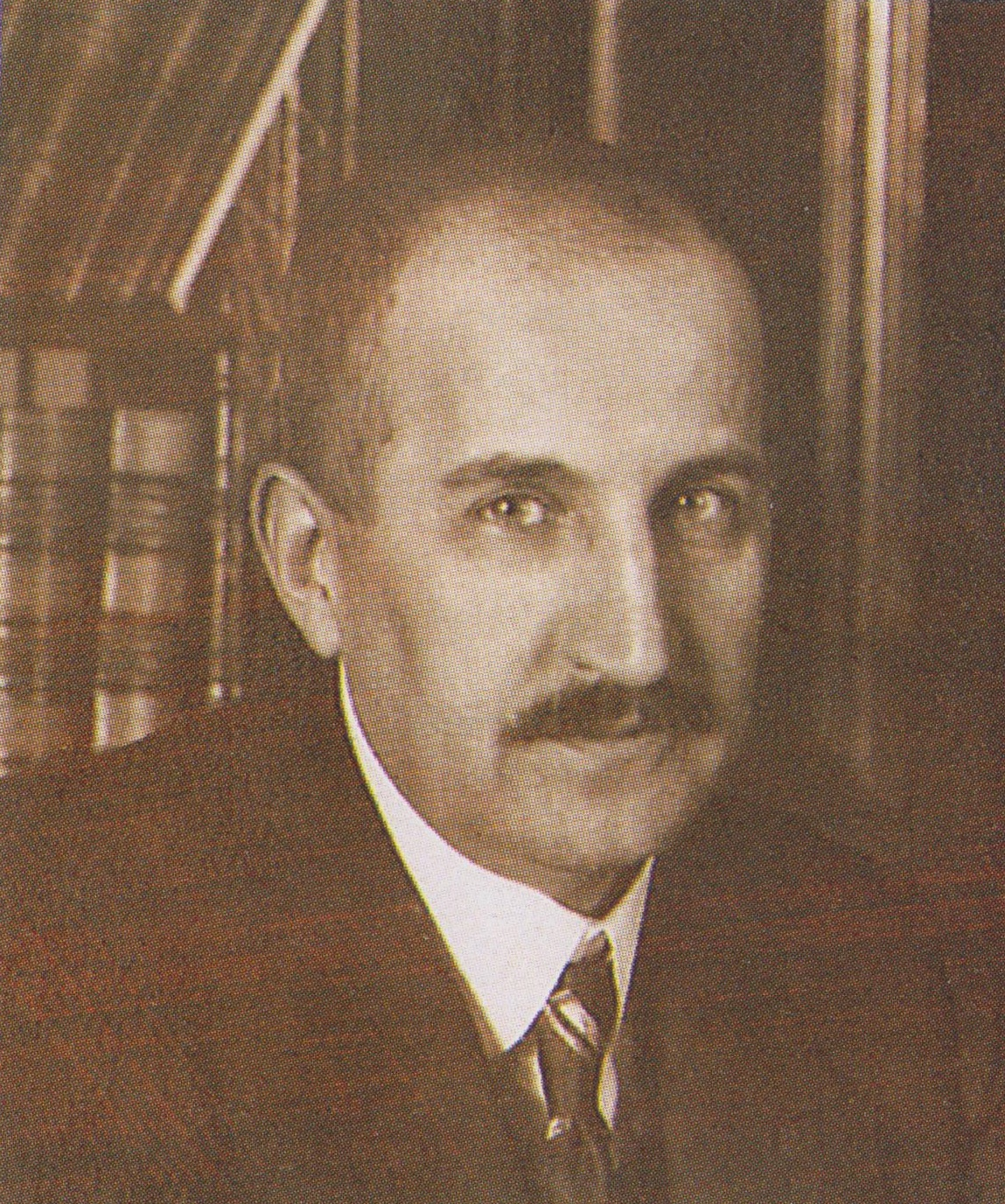
Dénes Berinkey

- June 5 – Józef Beck, Polish statesman (b. 1894)
- June 6
  - Joseph Campbell, Northern Irish poet and lyricist (b. 1879)
  - Wilhelm Falley, German general (killed in action) (b. 1897)
  - Don Pratt, American general (killed in action) (b. 1892)
  - Ker-Xavier Roussel, French painter (b. 1867)
- June 12 – Erich Marcks, German general (b. 1891)
- June 16
  - Marc Bloch, French historian (b. 1886)
  - Sir Prafulla Chandra Ray, Indian chemist (b. 1861)
  - George Stinney, a 14-year-old African-American boy convicted of murder in his hometown of Alcolu, South Carolina. Executed by electric chair. (b. 1929)
- June 18 – Harry Fielding Reid, American geophysicist and seismologist (b. 1859)
- June 25
  - Dénes Berinkey, 21st Prime Minister of Hungary (b. 1871)
  - Lucha Reyes, Mexican singer (b. 1906)
  - María Chinchilla Recinos, Guatemalan teacher (b. 1909)
- June 27 – Milan Hodža, Slovak politician, champion of regional integration in Europe (b. 1878)
- June 28 – Anton Breinl, Australian medical practitioner and researcher (b. 1880)

=== July ===
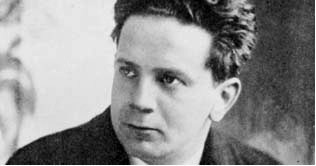
Carl Mayer

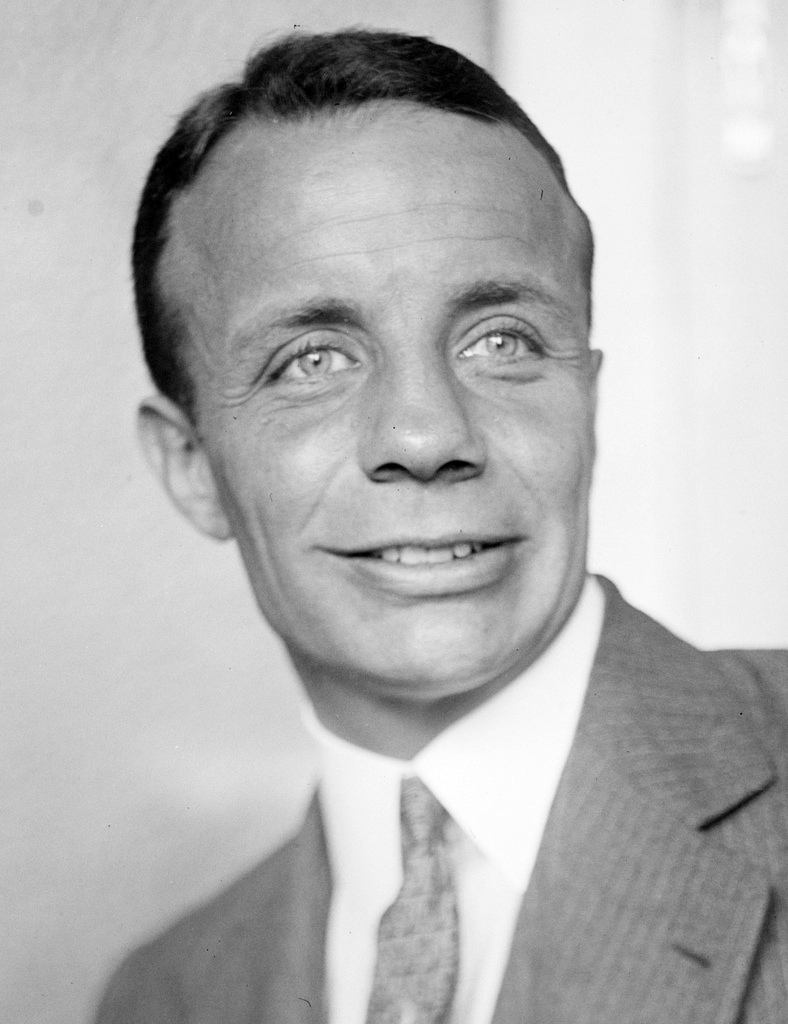
Theodore Roosevelt Jr.

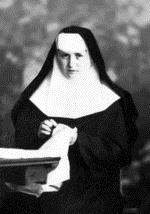
Tarsykiya Matskiv

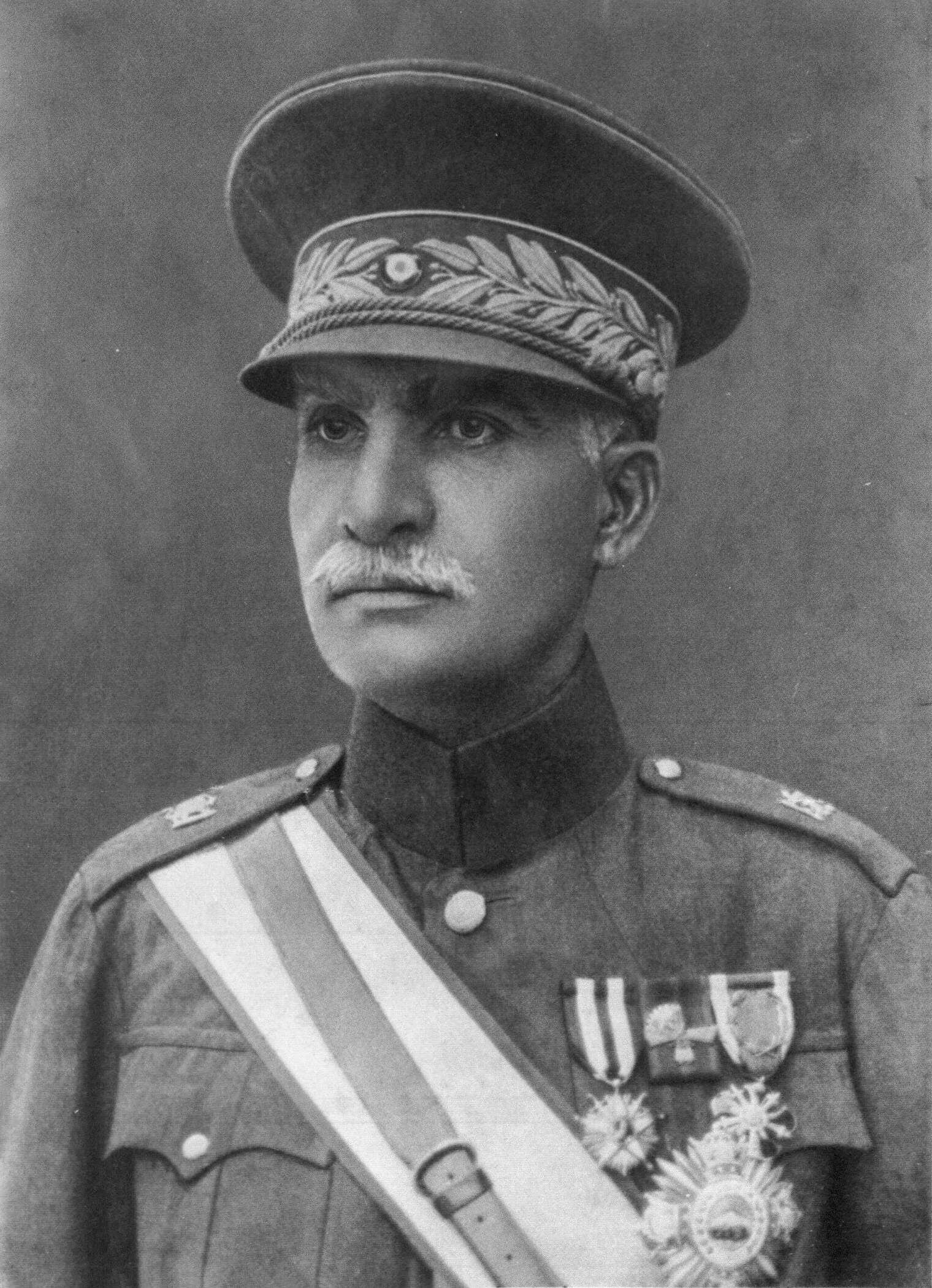
Reza Shah

- July 1 – Carl Mayer, Austrian-born screenwriter (cancer) (b. 1894)
- July 6
  - Andrée Borrel, French World War II heroine (executed) (b. 1919)
  - Vera Leigh, British World War II heroine (executed) (b. 1903)
  - Chūichi Nagumo, Japanese admiral (suicide) (b. 1887)
  - Sonya Olschanezky, German World War II heroine (executed) (b. 1923)
  - Diana Rowden, British World War II heroine (executed) (b. 1915)
- July 7
  - Georges Mandel, French politician and WWII hero (executed) (b. 1885)
  - Leonie von Meusebach–Zesch, American dentist (b. 1882)
- July 8
  - George B. Seitz, American director (b. 1888)
  - Takeo Takagi, Japanese admiral (killed in action) (b. 1892)
- July 9
  - Ingvar Fredrik Håkansson, Swedish pilot (killed in action) (b. 1920)
  - Kent Rogers, American voice actor (killed in military aircraft accident) (b. 1923)
- July 12
  - Jesus Baza Duenas, Guamese Roman Catholic priest, martyr and blessed (executed) (b. 1911)
  - Theodore Roosevelt Jr., American Brigadier General, political and business leader (heart attack) (b. 1887)
- July 14 – Asmahan, Syrian-born Egyptian singer (automobile accident) (b. 1912)
- July 15 – Joseph Sadi-Lecointe, French aviator (died from effects of torture) (b. 1891)
- July 16 – Moncena Dunn, American inventor (b. 1867)
- July 17
  - Tarsykiya Matskiv, Soviet Eastern Catholic religious sister and blessed (killed) (b. 1919)
  - William James Sidis, American mathematician and linguist (cerebral hemorrhage) (b. 1898)
- July 18
  - Augusto De Angelis, Italian writer and journalist (b. 1888)
  - George Holt, American actor and director (b. 1878)
  - Rex Whistler, British painter (killed in action) (b. 1905)
- July 20
  - Ludwig Beck, German general, former Chief of the German General Staff and resistance member (assisted suicide) (b. 1880)
  - Mildred Harris, American actress (complications following surgery) (b. 1901)
  - Günther Korten, German colonel-general, chief of staff of the Luftwaffe (died of injuries received in assassination attempt on Hitler) (b. 1898)
- July 21
  - Heinz Brandt, German officer (b. 1907)
  - Werner von Haeften, German resistance member (executed) (b. 1908)
  - Albrecht Mertz von Quirnheim, German resistance leader (b. 1905)
  - Hans-Ulrich von Oertzen, German resistance member (suicide) (b. 1915)
  - Friedrich Olbricht, German resistance leader (b. 1888)
  - Claus von Stauffenberg, German resistance leader (executed) (b. 1907)
  - Henning von Tresckow, German general and resistance leader (suicide) (b. 1901)
- July 23 – Eduard Wagner, German general and resistance member (suicide) (b. 1894)
- July 25
  - Lesley J. McNair, American general (b. 1883)
  - Jakob von Uexküll, Baltic German biologist (b. 1864)
- July 26
  - Clóvis Beviláqua, Brazilian jurist, historian and journalist (b. 1859)
  - Wessel Freytag von Loringhoven, German resistance member (suicide) (b. 1899)
  - Takakazu Kinashi, Japanese submarine commander (killed in action) (b. 1902)
  - Reza Shah, 20th Prime Minister of Iran and Shah of Iran (b. 1878)
- July 27 – Perry McGillivray, American Olympic swimmer (b. 1893)
- July 28 – Werner Schrader, German resistance member (suicide) (b. 1895)
- July 30
  - Nikolai Polikarpov, Soviet aeronautical engineer and aircraft designer (cancer) (b. 1892)
  - Lee Powell, American actor (killed in action) (b. 1908)
- July 31 – Antoine de Saint-Exupéry, French pilot and children's writer (missing on active service) (b. 1900)

=== August ===
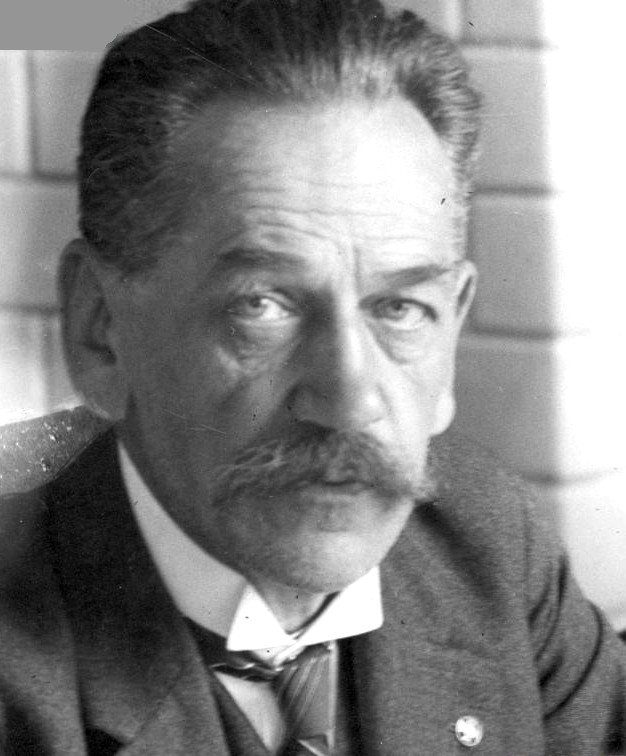
Jędrzej Moraczewski

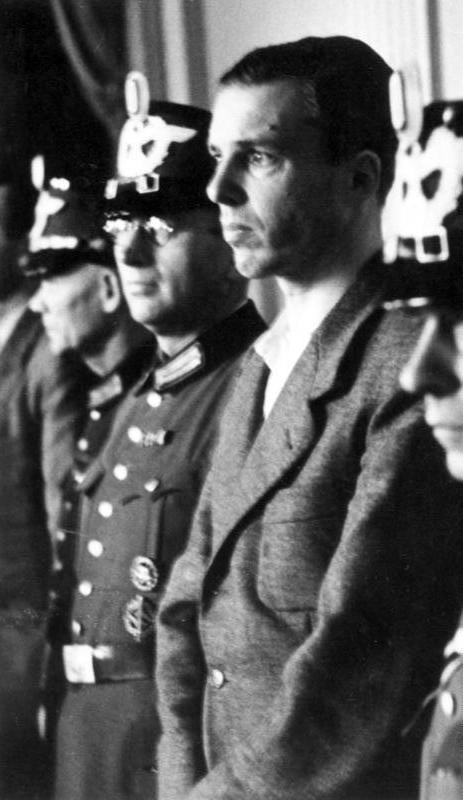
Berthold Schenk Graf von Stauffenberg

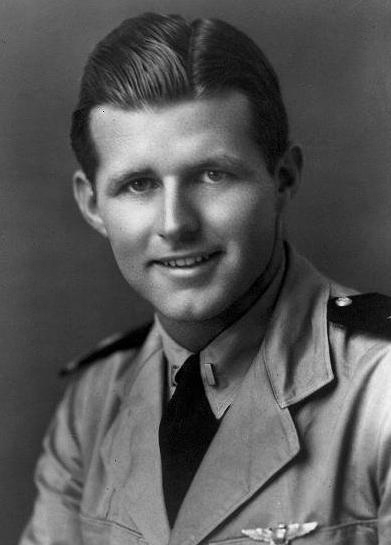
Joseph P. Kennedy Jr.

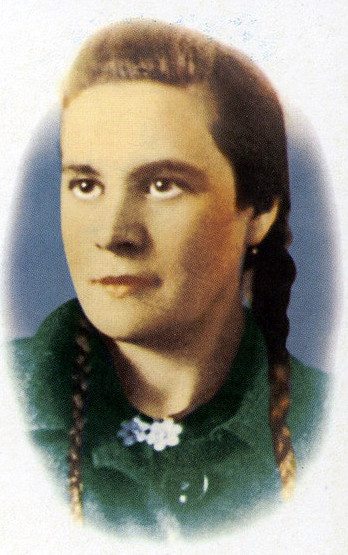
Blessed Teresa Bracco

- August 1 – Manuel L. Quezon, Filipino statesman, soldier and politician, 2nd President of the Philippines (b. 1878)
- August 2 – Kakuji Kakuta, Japanese admiral (b. 1890)
- August 4 – Krzysztof Kamil Baczyński, Polish poet (b. 1921)
- August 5 – Jędrzej Moraczewski, Polish politician, 2nd Prime Minister of Poland (b. 1870)
- August 7
  - Agustín Barrios, Paraguayan guitarist and composer (b. 1885)
  - Jadwiga Falkowska, Polish teacher and activist (b. 1889)
- August 8
  - Robert Bernardis, German resistance fighter (executed) (b. 1908)
  - Albrecht von Hagen, German resistance fighter (executed) (b. 1904)
  - Paul von Hase, German general and resistance leader (executed) (b. 1885)
  - Erich Hoepner, German colonel-general and resistance leader (executed) (b. 1886)
  - Juliusz Kaden-Bandrowski, Polish journalist and novelist (b. 1885)
  - Hellmuth Stieff, German resistance fighter (executed) (b. 1901)
  - Michael Wittmann, German tank commander (killed in action) (b. 1914)
  - Erwin von Witzleben, German field marshal and resistance leader (executed) (b. 1881)
  - Peter Yorck von Wartenburg, German resistance fighter (executed) (b. 1904)
- August 9 – Felix Nussbaum, German painter (b. 1904)
- August 10
  - Alfred Kranzfelder, German resistance fighter (b. 1908)
  - Fritz-Dietlof von der Schulenburg, German resistance fighter (b. 1902)
  - Berthold Schenk Graf von Stauffenberg, Nazi opponent and lawyer (b. 1905)
  - Hans Albrecht, Hereditary Prince of Schleswig-Holstein (b. 1917)
- August 11
  - Francesco Federico Falco, Italian doctor (b. 1866)
  - Hideyoshi Obata, Japanese general (b. 1890)
- August 12
  - Jose Garvida Flores, Filipino writer, poet and playwright (b. 1900)
  - Joseph P. Kennedy Jr., American fighter pilot, oldest son of Joseph P. Kennedy (b. 1915)
  - Suzanne Spaak, Belgian World War II heroine (b. 1905)
- August 15
  - Egbert Hayessen, German resistance fighter (b. 1913)
  - Hans Bernd von Haeften, German resistance fighter (b. 1905)
  - Wolf-Heinrich Graf von Helldorff, German police chief and resistance fighter (b. 1896)
- August 17
  - Franciszek Brodniewicz, Polish actor (b. 1892)
  - Eugénio de Castro, Portuguese poet and writer (b. 1869)
- August 18
  - Eugeniusz Horbaczewski, Polish pilot (b. 1917)
  - Ernst Thälmann, German Communist leader (executed) (b. 1886)
- August 19
  - Günther von Kluge, German field marshal (suicide) (b. 1882)
  - Sir Henry Wood, British conductor (b. 1869)
- August 21
  - Friedrich Gustav Jaeger, German resistance fighter (b. 1895)
  - Maciej Kalenkiewicz, Polish engineer and military officer (b. 1906)
  - Marian Lalewicz, Polish architect (b. 1876)
- August 23
  - Aleksander Augustynowicz, Polish painter (b. 1865)
  - Abdülmecid II, last Caliph of the Ottoman Empire (b. 1868)
  - Nikolai Roslavets, Soviet composer (b. 1880)
- August 24 – Carlo Emanuele Buscaglia, Italian aviator (b. 1915)
- August 25 – Teresio Vittorio Martinoli, Italian pilot (b. 1917)
- August 26
  - Hans Georg Klamroth, German resistance fighter (executed) (b. 1898)
  - Otto Kiep, German resistance fighter (b. 1886)
  - Hans Leesment, Estonian general (b. 1873)
  - Ludwig Freiherr von Leonrod, German resistance fighter (executed) (b. 1906)
  - Adam von Trott zu Solz, German diplomat and resistance fighter (executed) (b. 1909)
- August 27 – Carlo Fecia di Cossato, Italian navy officer (b. 1908)
- August 28
  - Teresa Bracco, Italian Roman Catholic religious sister and blessed (killed in battle) (b. 1924)
  - Rudolf Breitscheid, German politician (b. 1874)
  - Bronislaw Kaminski, Polish army officer (b. 1899)
  - Princess Mafalda of Savoy (b. 1902)
- August 30
  - Moissaye Boguslawski, American pianist and composer (b. 1887)
  - Eberhard Finckh, German resistance fighter (b. 1899)
  - Hans Otfried von Linstow, German resistance fighter (b. 1899)
  - Carl-Heinrich von Stülpnagel, German general and resistance leader (b. 1886)

=== September ===
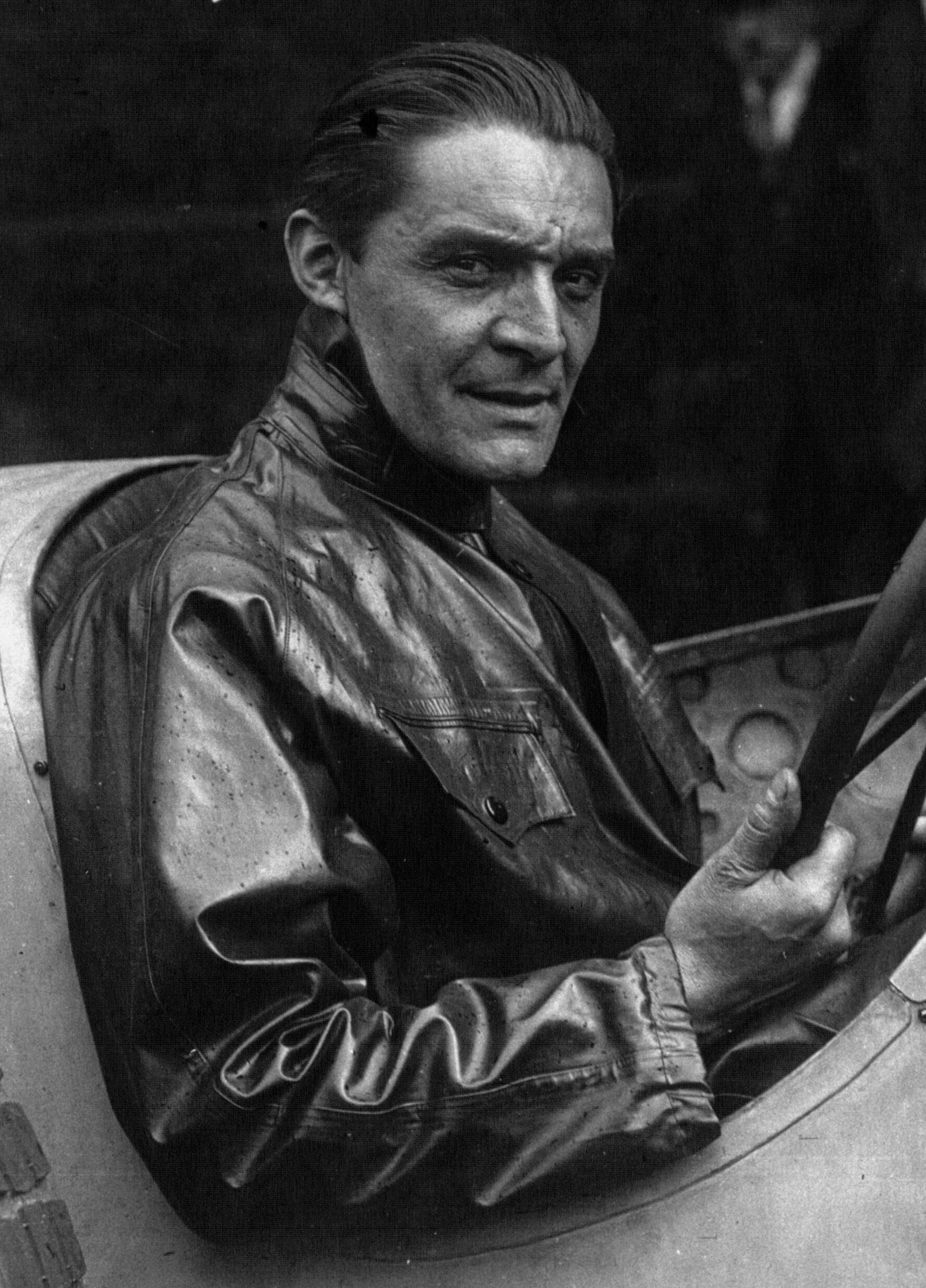
Robert Benoist

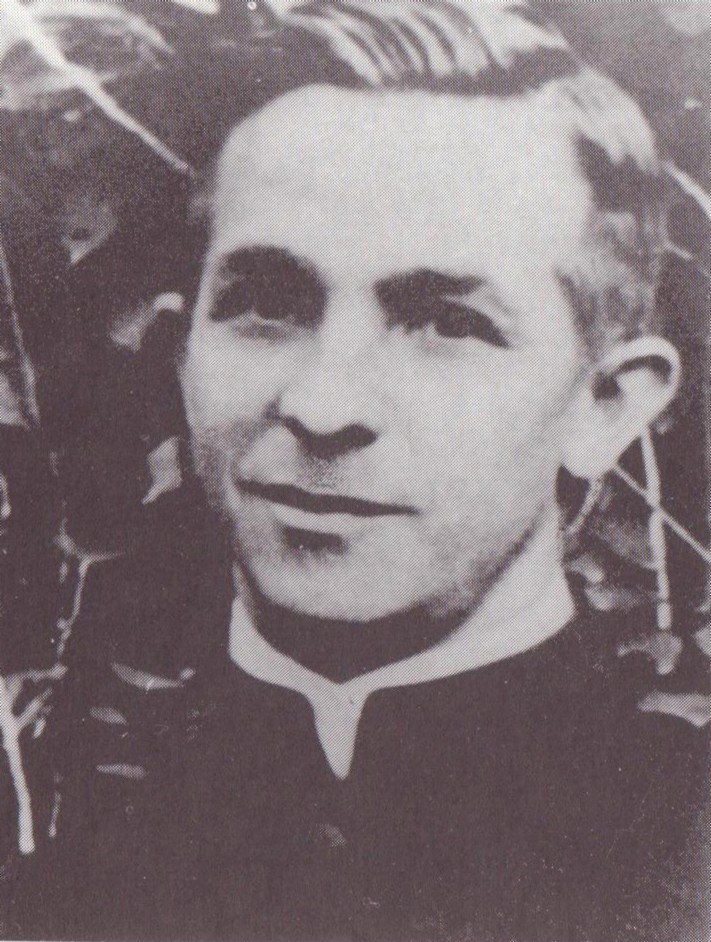
Joseph Müller

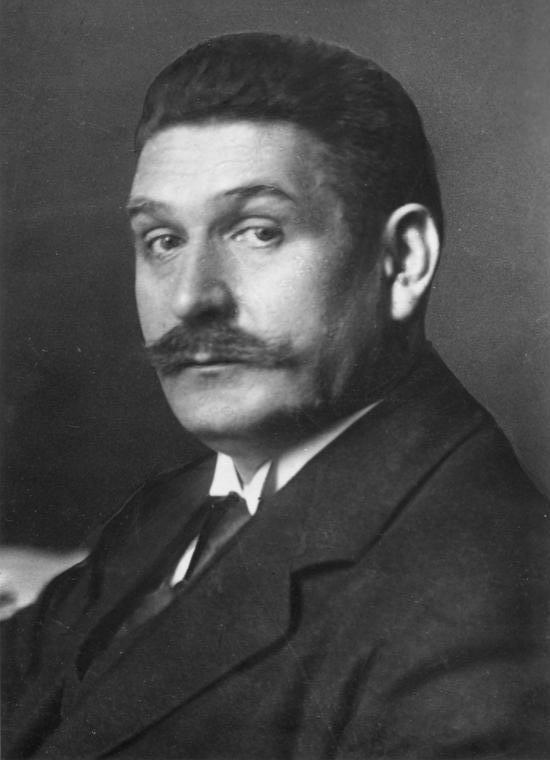
Gustav Bauer

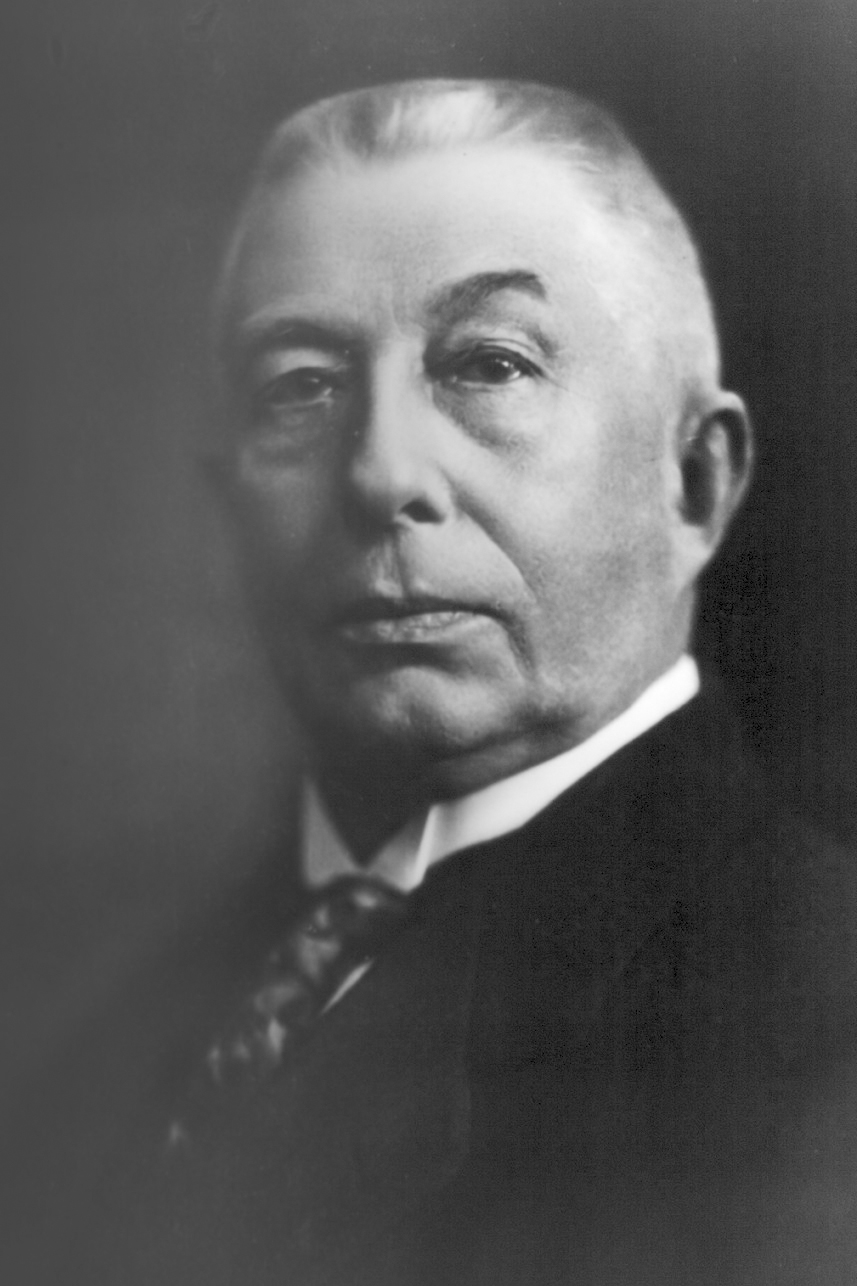
Hendrikus Colijn

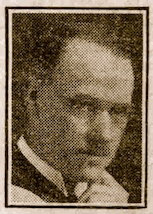
David Dougal Williams

- September 1 – Krystyna Dąbrowska, Polish sculptor and painter (b. 1906)
- September 2 – Maria Vetulani de Nisau, Polish soldier (b. 1898)
- September 3 – Friedrich Alpers, German Nazi politician and general (b. 1901)
- September 4
  - Erich Fellgiebel, German general and resistance fighter (b. 1886)
  - Heinrich Graf von Lehndorff-Steinort, German resistance fighter (b. 1909)
  - Fritz Thiele, German general and resistance fighter (b. 1894)
- September 5 – Gustave Biéler, Swiss WWII hero (b. 1904)
- September 6 – Jan Franciszek Czartoryski, Polish Dominican friar, martyr and blessed (b. 1897)
- September 7 – Eduardo Sánchez de Fuentes, Cuban composer (b. 1897)
- September 8
  - Georg Hansen, German resistance fighter (b. 1904)
  - Ulrich von Hassell, German diplomat and resistance fighter (b. 1881)
  - Paul Lejeune-Jung, German resistance fighter (b. 1882)
  - Ulrich Wilhelm Graf Schwerin von Schwanenfeld, German resistance fighter (b. 1902)
  - Günther Smend, German resistance fighter (b. 1912)
  - Josef Wirmer, German resistance fighter (b. 1901)
- September 11
  - Robert Benoist, French race car driver and war hero (b. 1895)
  - Joseph Müller, German Roman Catholic priest and Servant of God (executed) (b. 1894)
- September 12 – Robert Fiske, American actor (b. 1889)
- September 13
  - Yolande Beekman, French WWII heroine (executed) (b. 1911)
  - Madeleine Damerment, French WWII heroine (executed) (b. 1917)
  - Noor Inayat Khan, Indian WWII heroine (executed) (b. 1914)
  - Eliane Plewman, British WWII heroine (executed) (b. 1917)
  - W. Heath Robinson, British cartoonist and illustrator (b. 1872)
- September 14
  - Heinrich Graf zu Dohna-Schlobitten, German resistance fighter (executed) (b. 1882)
  - Ken Macalister, Canadian WWII hero (b. 1914)
  - Michael Graf von Matuschka, German resistance fighter (executed) (b. 1888)
  - Frank Pickersgill, Canadian WWII hero (b. 1915)
  - Roméo Sabourin, Canadian WWII hero (b. 1923)
  - Nikolaus von Üxküll-Gyllenband, German resistance fighter (executed) (b. 1877)
  - Hermann Josef Wehrle, German Catholic priest and resistance member (executed) (b. 1899)
- September 16 – Gustav Bauer, 11th Chancellor of Germany (b. 1870)
- September 18
  - Hendrikus Colijn, Dutch policeman, politician and businessman, 25th Prime Minister of the Netherlands (b. 1869)
  - Anton Saefkow, German communist (executed) (b. 1903)
- September 19
  - Guy Gibson, British bomber pilot (b. 1918)
  - John J. Schumacher, American entrepreneur
- September 20 – Friedrich Boedicker, German admiral (b. 1866)
- September 22 – Fritz Lindemann, German army officer (died of wounds) (b. 1894)
- September 23 – Matylda Pálfyová, Slovak artistic gymnast (b. 1912)
- September 25
  - Walter Breisky, Austrian civil servant, acting Chancellor of Austria (b. 1871)
  - Eugeniusz Lokajski, Polish athlete, gymnast and photographer (b. 1909)
  - Leo Chiozza Money, Italian-British economist and politician (b. 1870)
- September 27
  - Aimee Semple McPherson, Canadian-American Pentecostal evangelist (b. 1890)
  - Aristide Maillol, French sculptor and painter (b. 1861)
  - David Dougal Williams, British painter (b. 1888)
- September 28 – Josef Bürckel, German Nazi gauleiter (b. 1895)
- September 29
  - Otto Herfurth, German general and resistance fighter (b. 1893)
  - Wilhelm Leuschner German politician and resistance fighter (b. 1890)
  - Joachim Meichssner, German resistance fighter (b. 1906)
  - Joachim Sadrozinski, German resistance fighter (b. 1907)

=== October ===
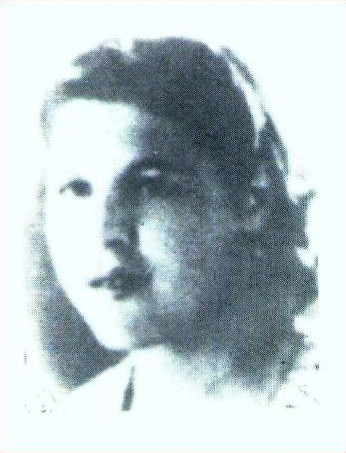
Stefanina Moro

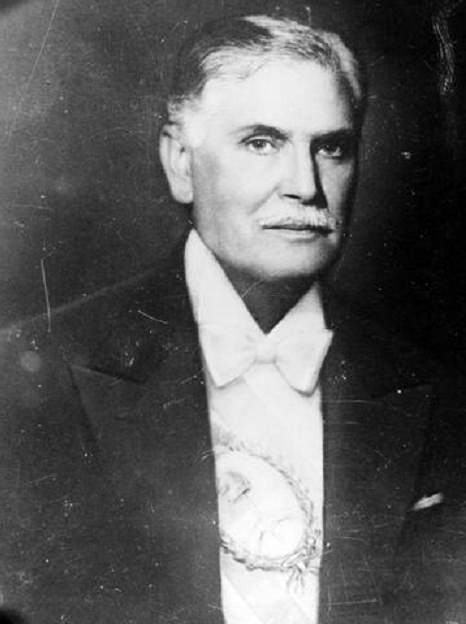
Ramón Castillo

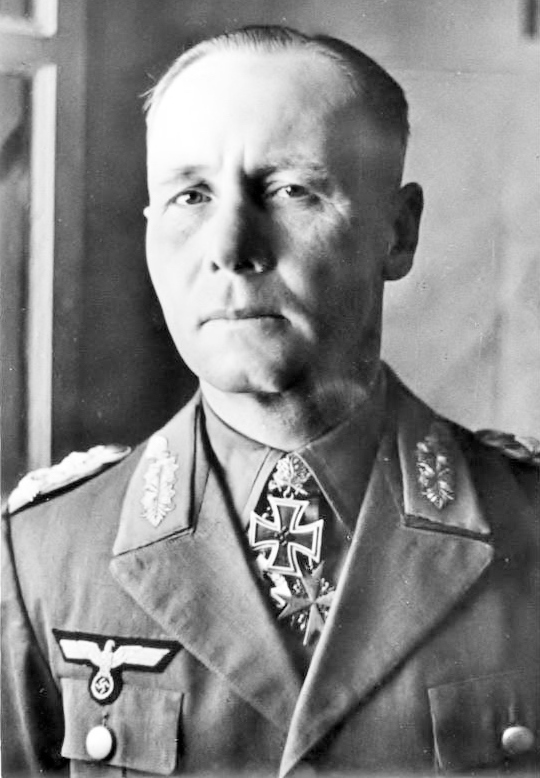
Erwin Rommel

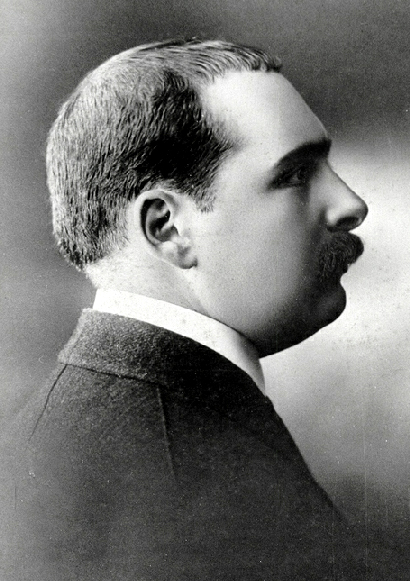
José de la Riva-Agüero y Osma

- October 1
  - Max Ehrlich, German actor, screenwriter and humor writer (b. 1892)
  - Sir William Mulock, Canadian lawyer, politician and businessman (b. 1843)
  - Rudolf Schmundt, German general (b. 1896)
- October 2
  - Benjamin Fondane, Romanian-French Symbolist poet, critic and existentialist philosopher (gassed in Auschwitz concentration camp) (b. 1898)
  - Julián Felipe, Filipino musician and bandleader (b. 1861)
  - Maeda Toshisada, Japanese politician (b. 1874)
- October 4 – Al Smith, American politician (b. 1873)
- October 5 – Prince Gustav of Denmark (b. 1887)
- October 8 – Wendell Willkie, American politician (b. 1892)
- October 9
  - Kitty Marion, German-born actress and women's rights activist in England and the United States (b. 1871)
  - Stefanina Moro, Italian resistance member (b. 1927)
- October 12
  - Ramón Castillo, Argentinian politician, 25th President of Argentina (b. 1873)
  - Carl Langbehn, German resistance member (b. 1901)
  - Rudolf von Marogna-Redwitz, German resistance member (b. 1886)
- October 13
  - Hans-Jürgen von Blumenthal, German resistance member (b. 1907)
  - Roland von Hößlin, German resistance member (b. 1915)
- October 14 – Erwin Rommel, German field marshal (b. 1891)
- October 17 – Anton Hafner, German aviator (b. 1918)
- October 18
  - Alexander, Prince of Erbach-Schönberg (b. 1872)
  - Josef Maria Eder, Austrian chemist (b. 1855)
- October 19
  - Isadore Bernstein, American screenwriter (b. 1876)
  - Deneys Reitz, South African soldier and diplomat (b. 1882)
- October 20
  - Eduard Brücklmeier, German diplomat and resistance member (b. 1903)
  - Hermann Maaß, German politician and resistance member (b. 1897)
  - Adolf Reichwein, German politician and resistance member (b. 1898)
- October 21
  - Nell Brinkley, American illustrator and comic artist (b. 1886)
  - Hilma af Klint, Swedish abstract painter (b. 1862)
- October 22 – Richard Bennett, American actor (b. 1870)
- October 23 – Charles Glover Barkla, British physicist, Nobel Prize laureate (b. 1877)
- October 24
  - Louis Renault, French industrialist, founder of Renault (b. 1877)
  - Karl Freiherr von Thüngen, German general and resistance member (executed) (b. 1893)
- October 25
  - Shōji Nishimura, Japanese vice admiral (b. 1889)
  - José de la Riva-Agüero y Osma, Peruvian historian, writer and politician, 84th Prime Minister of Peru (b. 1885)
  - Yukio Seki, Japanese kamikaze pilot (b. 1921)
- October 26
  - Princess Beatrice of the United Kingdom, youngest and last surviving child of Queen Victoria (b. 1857)
  - Hiroyoshi Nishizawa, Japanese fighter ace (b. 1920)
  - William Temple, Archbishop of Canterbury (b. 1881)
- October 27 – Judith Auer, German World War II resistance fighter (b. 1905)
- October 31
  - Henrietta Crosman, American actress (b. 1861)
  - Joseph Hubert Priestley, British botanist (b. 1883)

=== November ===
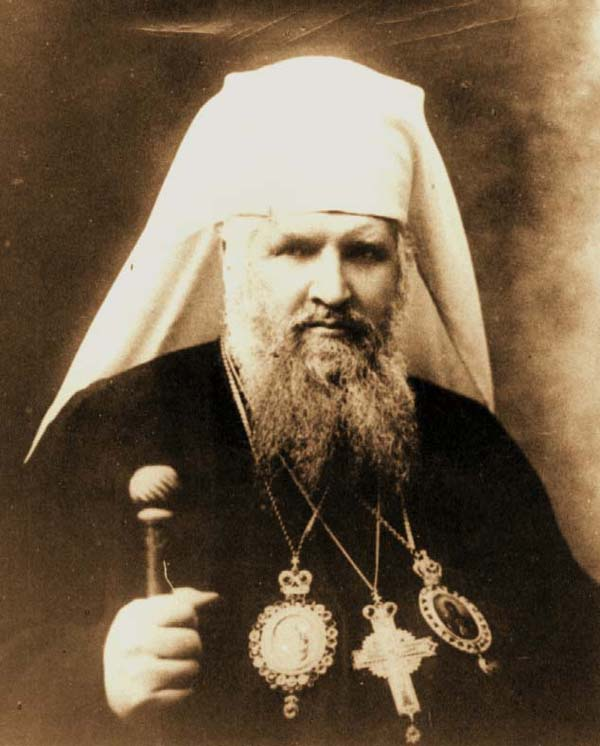
Andrey Sheptytsky

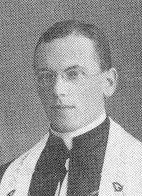
Blessed Carl Lampert

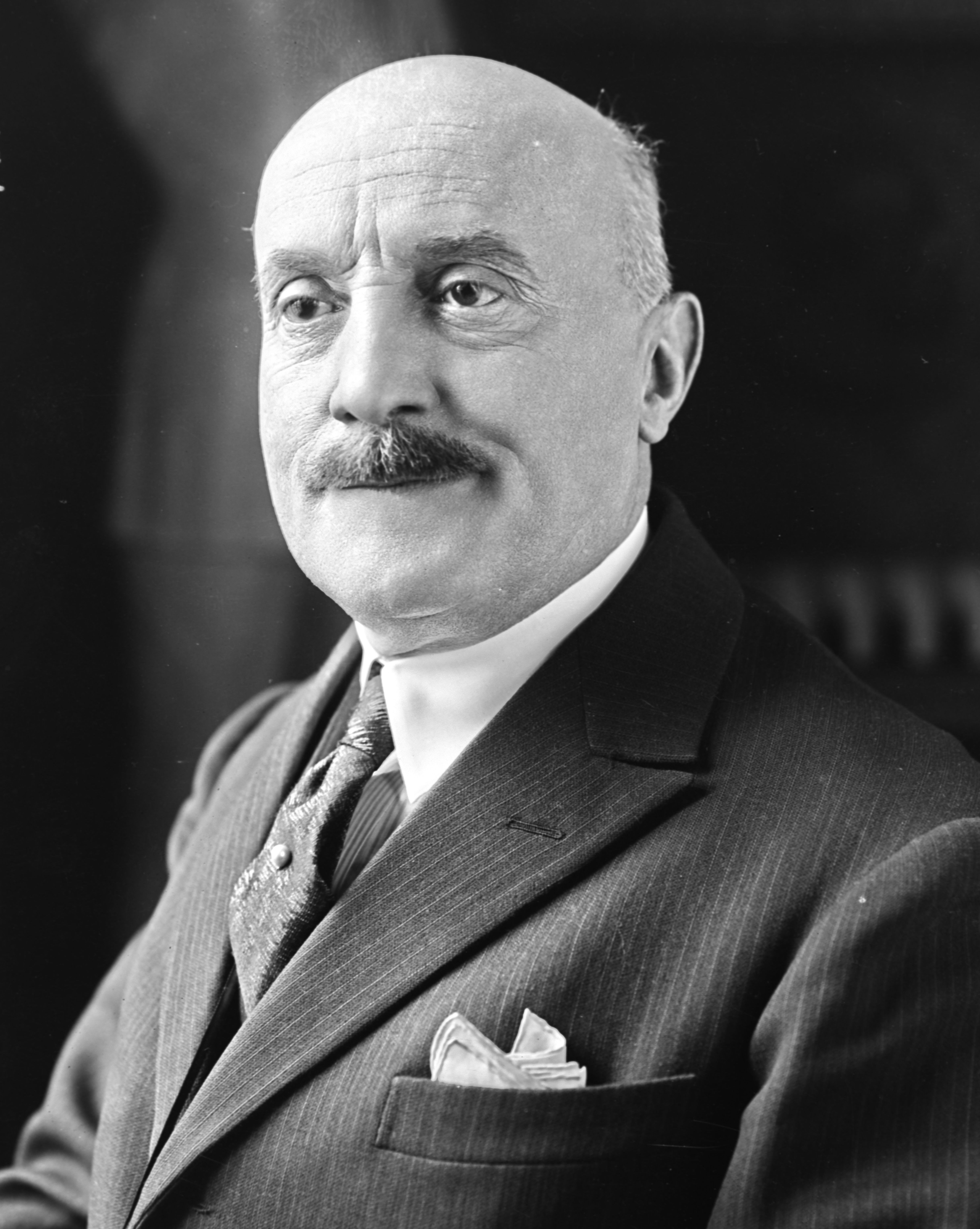
Joseph Caillaux

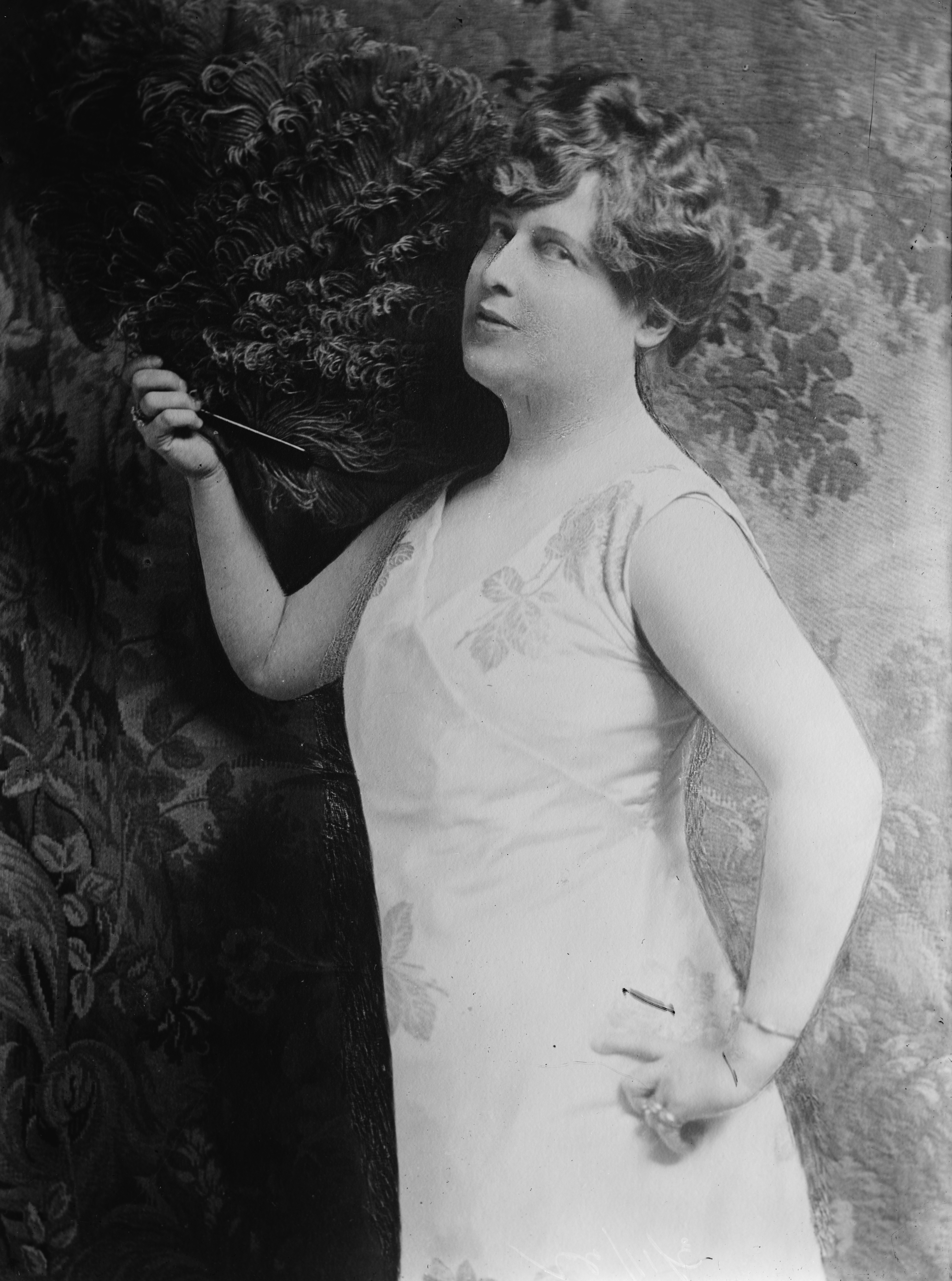
Florence Foster Jenkins

- November 1
  - Ismael Pérez Pazmiño, Ecuadoran journalist and politician (b. 1876)
  - Andrey Sheptytsky, Soviet Eastern Catholic archbishop and venerable (b. 1865)
- November 2
  - Karol Irzykowski, Polish writer (b. 1873)
  - Thomas Midgley Jr., American chemist and inventor (b. 1889)
- November 4 – Sir John Dill, British field marshal (b. 1881)
- November 5 – Alexis Carrel, French surgeon and biologist, recipient of the Nobel Prize in Physiology or Medicine (b. 1873)
- November 7
  - Max Bergmann, German biochemist (b. 1886)
  - Richard Sorge, German-born Soviet spy, executed (b. 1895)
  - Hannah Szenes, Hungarian World War II heroine, poet, executed (b. 1921)
- November 10
  - Wang Jingwei, Chinese statesman, President of the Nanjing-based and Japanese-supported collaborationist Government of the Republic of China (b. 1883)
  - Friedrich-Werner Graf von der Schulenburg, German diplomat and resistance member (b. 1875)
- November 12
  - George David Birkhoff, American mathematician (b. 1884)
  - George Houston, American actor (b. 1896)
  - Otto Frank, German physiologist (b. 1865)
- November 13
  - Carl Lampert, Austrian Roman Catholic priest and blessed (b. 1894)
  - Friedrich Lorenz, German Roman Catholic priest and blessed (b. 1897)
- November 14
  - Walter Cramer, German resistance member (b. 1886)
  - Sir Trafford Leigh-Mallory, British aviator and Royal Air Force Air Chief Marshal (b. 1892)
  - Bernhard Letterhaus, German trade unionist and resistance member (b. 1894)
  - Ferdinand von Lüninck, German politician and resistance member (b. 1888)
- November 15 – Cayetano Santos Godino, Argentine serial killer and arsonist (b. 1896)
- November 16 – Maria Rodziewiczówna, Polish writer (b. 1863)
- November 19 – Ignacio Bolívar, Spanish naturalist and entomologist (b. 1850)
- November 22
  - Joseph Caillaux, French politician, 57th Prime Minister of France (b. 1863)
  - Sir Arthur Eddington, British astronomer, physicist and mathematician (b. 1882)
  - Sadakichi Hartmann, Japanese-born American critic and poet (b. 1867)
  - Johan Pitka, Estonian entrepreneur, sea captain and admiral (b. 1872)
- November 25 – Kenesaw Mountain Landis, 1st commissioner of Major League Baseball (b. 1866)
- November 26 – Florence Foster Jenkins, American socialite and singer (b. 1868)
- November 30 – Lilo Gloeden, German resistance member (b. 1903)

=== December ===
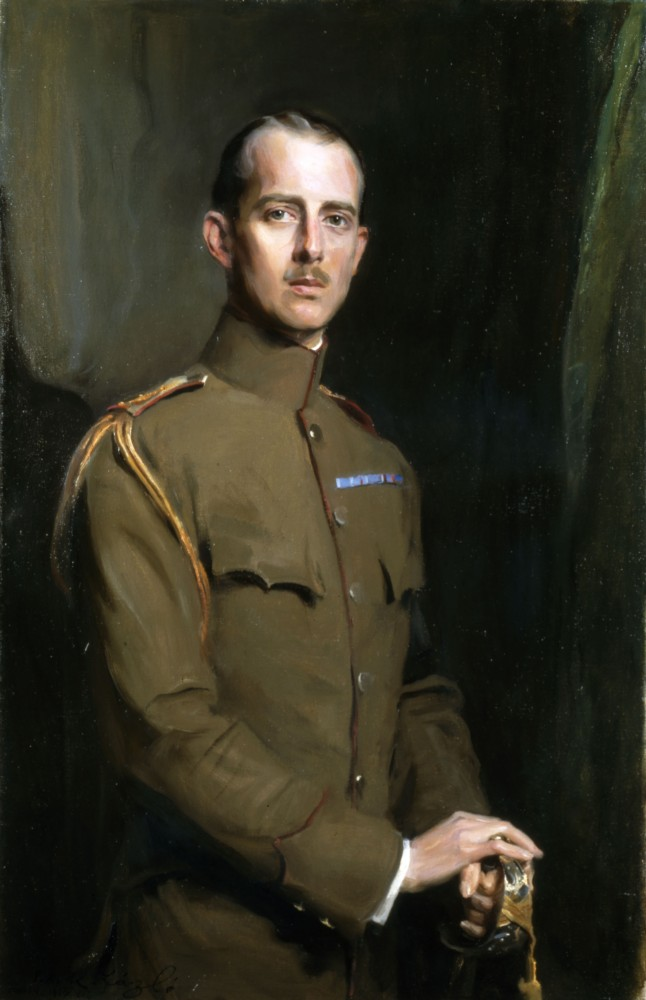
Prince Andrew of Greece and Denmark

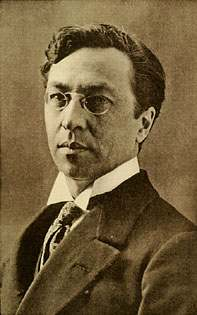
Wassily Kandinsky

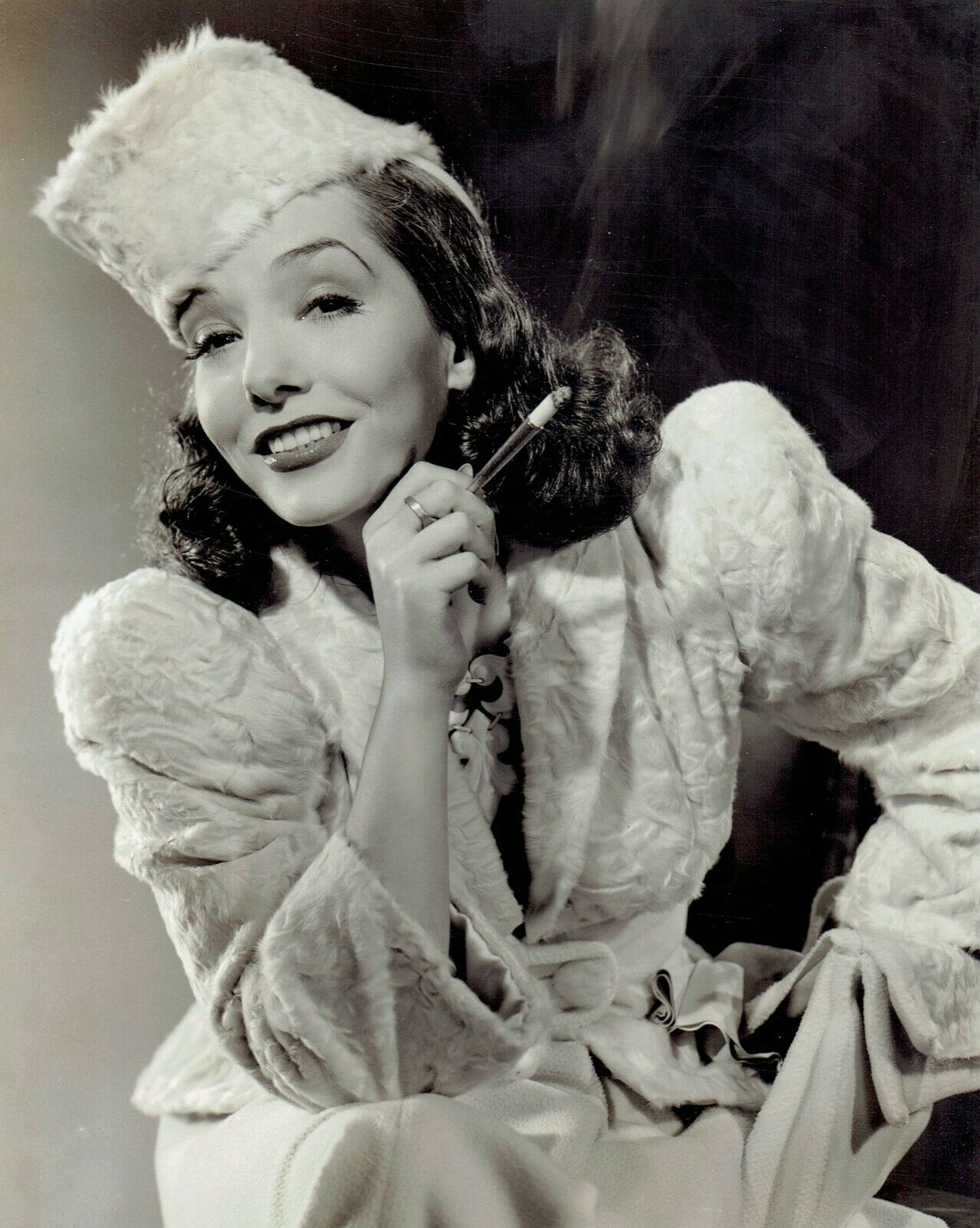
Lupe Vélez

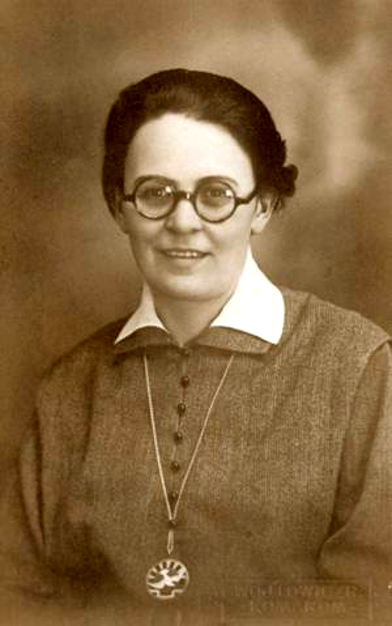
Blessed Sára Salkaházi

- December 1 – Franciszek Pius Radziwiłł, Polish nobleman and activist (b. 1878)
- December 2
  - Filippo Tommaso Marinetti, Italian poet, editor and art theorist, founder of the Futurist movement (b. 1876)
  - Josef Lhévinne, Soviet pianist (b. 1874)
- December 3 – Prince Andrew of Greece and Denmark (b. 1882)
- December 4 – Roger Bresnahan, American baseball player and member of the MLB Hall of Fame (b. 1879)
- December 9 – Laird Cregar, American actor (b. 1913)
- December 11 – Montgomery Cunningham Meigs, American WWII hero (b. 1919)
- December 12 – Bernard Chrzanowski, Polish activist (b. 1861)
- December 13 – Wassily Kandinsky, Russian-born Polish artist (b. 1866)
- December 14 – Lupe Vélez, Mexican actress, dancer and singer (b. 1908)
- December 15 – Glenn Miller, American band leader (accident) (b. 1904)
- December 19 – King Abbas II of Egypt (b. 1874)
- December 20
  - Caesar von Hofacker, German resistance member (b. 1896)
  - Fritz Pfeffer, German-Dutch housemate of Anne Frank (b. 1889)
  - Carl Wentzel, German resistance member (b. 1875)
- December 22 – Harry Langdon, American comedian (b. 1884)
- December 26 – George Bellamy, British actor (b. 1866)
- December 27
  - Amy Beach, American pianist and composer (b. 1867)
  - Peter Deunov, Bulgarian spiritual teacher (b. 1864)
  - Sára Salkaházi, Hungarian Roman Catholic religious sister and blessed (b. 1899)
- December 30 – Romain Rolland, French writer, Nobel Prize laureate (b. 1866)
- December 31
  - Vicente Lim, Filipino general of the Armed Forces of the Philippines (b. 1888)
  - Ruth Hanna McCormick, American politician, activist and publisher (b. 1880)

== Nobel Prizes ==
- Physics – Isidor Isaac Rabi
- Chemistry – Otto Hahn
- Medicine – Joseph Erlanger, Herbert Spencer Gasser
- Literature – Johannes V. Jensen
- Peace – International Committee of the Red Cross
