= Dionys Baeriswyl =

Swiss theoretical physicist (1944–2023)

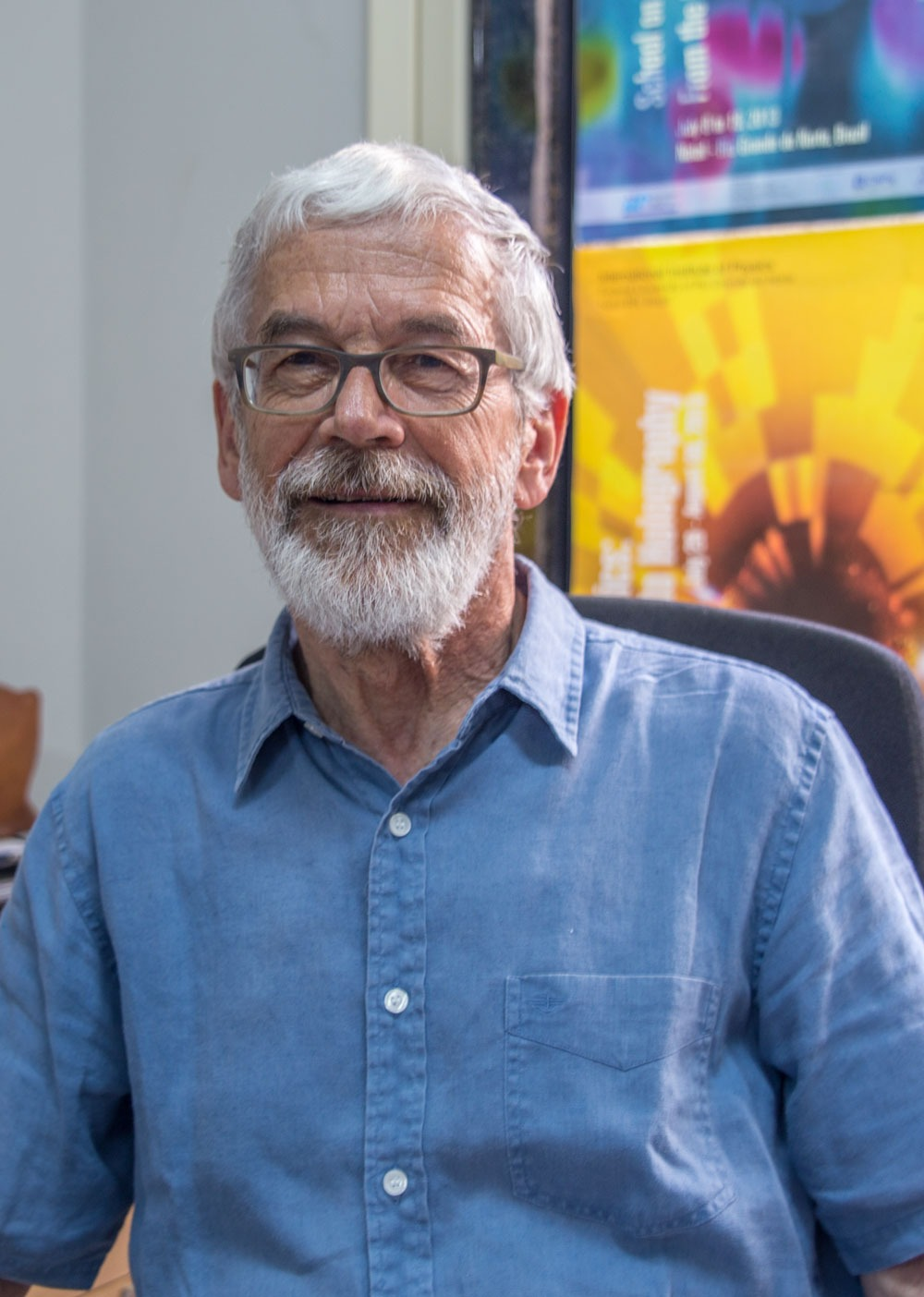
- Born: 23 June 1944
- Died: 9 August 2023 (aged 79)
- Known for: the Baeriswyl wave function

Dionys Baeriswyl (23 June 1944 – 9 August 2023) was a Swiss theoretical physicist and Emeritus Full Professor at the University of Fribourg in Switzerland, who worked on Condensed matter physics. Baeriswyl was known primarily for his contributions to the theory of strongly correlated electron systems. In particular, he had conducted fundamental work on conjugated polymer and other quasi-one-dimensional electronic systems, emphasizing early on the importance of electronic correlations in these systems. In addition, Baeriswyl was known for his work on variational wave function approaches to one- and two-dimensional correlated electron systems, applying them to the Peierls transition and the Mott transitions as well as to superconductivity in high-Tc cuprate. In the course of this work, he introduced the variational wave function known as the Baeriswyl wave function, which can be viewed as the strong-coupling complement to the Gutzwiller wave function. While the Gutzwiller wave function incorporates correlation effects into the free electron state, the Baeriswyl wave function incorporates itinerant electron movement into a localized, strongly correlated insulating state.

== Early life and education ==
Dionys Baeriswyl was born on 23 June 1944, as the son of Alois (1899–1985) and Maria Elisabeth Baeriswyl-Notter (1908–1964). He attended gymnasium at the benedictine college in Sarnen where he discovered his passions for natural science, foreign languages and music, especially the piano and organ. He concluded his studies in physics in 1969 at the University of Basel with a diploma in theoretical nuclear physics. In 1973 he earned his PhD at the University of Geneva with a thesis on the theory of elementary excitations in superfluid helium. In 1979 he obtained the teaching diploma of higher education of the Canton of Zürich. In 1985 he was given his Venia Legendi at the ETH Zurich with a habilitation thesis on theoretical aspects of conducting polymers.

== Academic career ==
Baeriswyl led the Institute of Theoretical Physics at the University of Fribourg from 1989 until 2000, served as the Dean of the Faculty of Science between 2002 and 2004, and became the President of the Department of Physics from 2007 to 2009. In 2003, he successfully opposed severe budget cuts by publicly defending the faculty: La faculté des sciences est une entreprise saine.

== Fribourg Center for Nanomaterials (FriMat) ==
During his tenure as Dean of the Faculty of Science at the University of Fribourg, Dionys Baeriswyl encountered Swiss Entrepreneur Adolphe Merkle to discuss the granting of the honorary doctorate at the Dies Academicus on 15 November 2003. Merkle donated in 2006, among others through Baeriswyl's facilitation, 100 million Swiss Francs to the University of Fribourg for the foundation of a new scientific institute for nanomaterials (FriMat), later called Adolphe Merkle Institute.

== Advisor of the International Institute of Physics (IIP) in Natal, Brazil ==
Dionys Baeriswyl served on the International Advisory Council (IAC) of the Institute of Physics (IIP) in Natal, Brazil, for six years beginning with its creation in 2009.

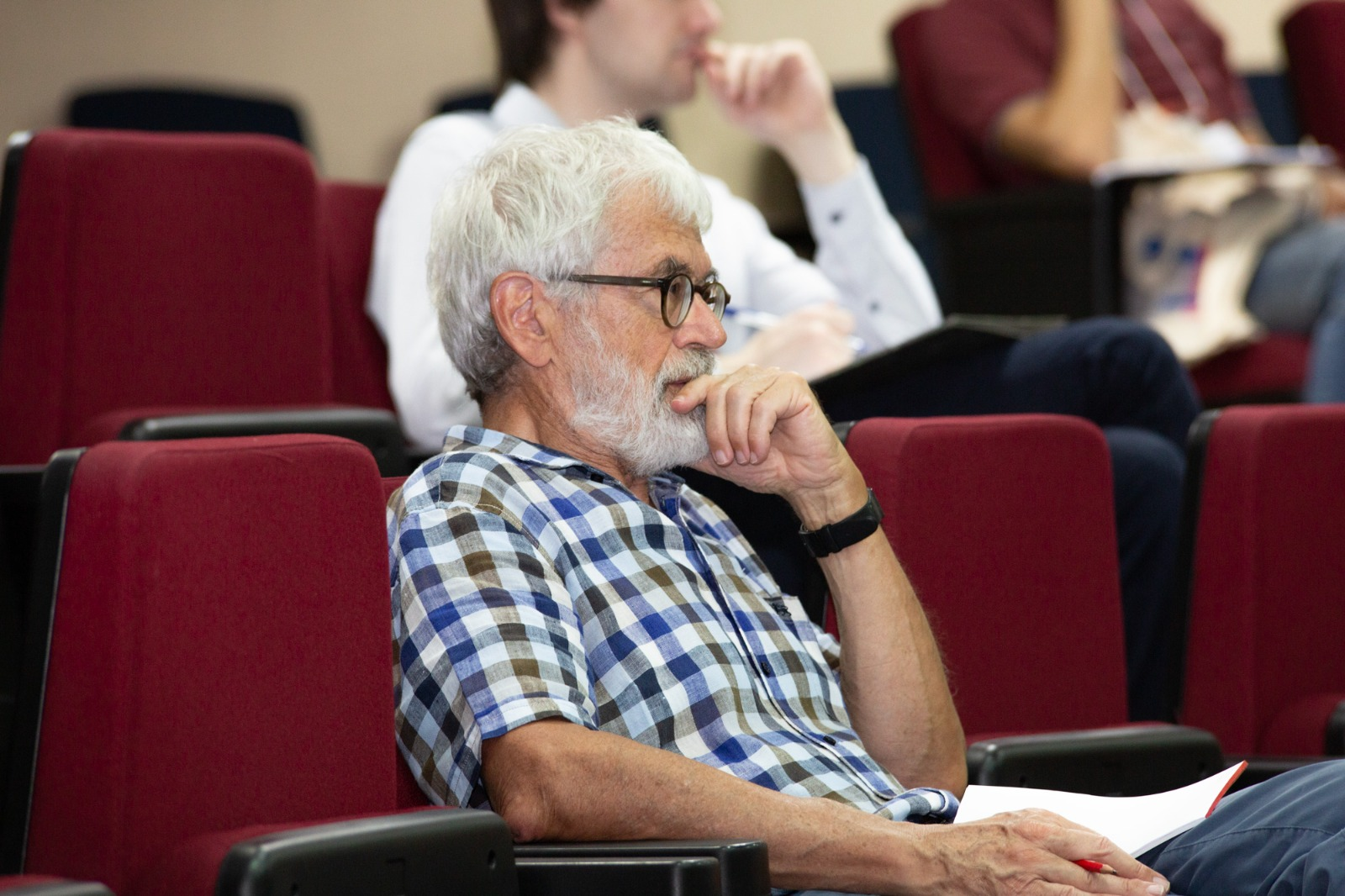
Dionys Baeriswyl in the auditorium of the International Institute of Physics in Natal, Brazil

The IAC provided the academic leadership of the IIP, guiding the academic programs, new hirings of research leaders, and the development of new research areas. At the IIP, Baeriswyl was also directly involved in the organization of several scientific meetings in condensed matter physics and related topics. After leaving the board, he became an IIP Distinguished Professor.

== Organizor of conferences and meetings ==
=== Gwatt meetings ===
Baeriswyl organized conferences at Gwatt (at the Lake Thun, Switzerland) from 1977 to 1993 covering topics like The RG method in condensed-matter physics (1977), Non-equilibrium instabilities (1978), Current problems in superconductivity (1979), Low-dimensional materials, polymers and liquid crystals (1981), Nonlinear phenomena (1982), Broken symmetry in condensed-matter physics and field theory (1985), Physics in living matter (1986), Quantum mechanics today (1987), New developments in the many-electron problem (1989), Electron transport in low-dimensional structures (1900), Phenomenology of superconductivity (1991), Magnetism (1992).

=== Institute for Scientific Interchange (ISI) in Turin, Italy ===
Beginning in 1987, just after the discovery of high-Tc superconductivity, with a group of seven scientists from six countries (the only country with two participants was Switzerland), the workshops at the Institute for Scientific Interchange in Turin expanded to involve large groups of scientists from the West and the former Soviet Union in a "moveable feast" of brainstorming on that challenging topic for several months a year during the period from 1987 to 1993. In 1988, Baeriswyl was the lead editor on the book "Interacting Electrons in Reduced Dimensions," reporting on a NATO Advanced Summer Institute of the same name held at the ISI in October 1988. The results of that workshop were published as the NATO ASI Series B: Physics volume 213 (1989) In the ensuing years, Baeriswyl continued serving as a member of the Scientific Advisory Committee of the ISI for two decades.

=== International workshops in Évora, Portugal ===
Programme of the conference in Évora, Portugal, 4–9 October 1998

Between 1989 and 2019, Baeriswyl collaborated closely with José M.P. Carmelo and other physicists as an organizer of, and contributor to, many international workshops held in Évora, Portugal. These events brought outstanding speakers from around the world and contributed significantly to the scientific education of young researchers, mainly from Portugal and Spain.

== Death ==
Dionys Baeriswyl died of cancer on 9 August 2023, at the age of 79.

== Publications ==
A list of his references includes

– on polymers:

- D.B. and K. Maki, Electron Correlations in Polyacetylene, Physical Review B 31, 6633 (1985)
- D.B., D.K. Campbell, and S. Mazumdar, An Overview of the Theory of pi-Conjugated Polymers, in H.G. Kiess (Ed.), Conjugated Conducting Polymers, Springer Series in Solid-State Sciences 102 (Springer, Berlin, 1992), p. 21

– on the Baeriswyl variational wave function:

- D.B., Variational schemes for Many-Electron Systems, in A.R. Bishop et al. (Ed.), Nonlinearity in Condensed Matter, Springer Series in Solid State Sciences 69 (Springer, Berlin, 1987), p. 183
- M. Dzierzawa, D.B., and M. Di Stasio, Variational wave functions for the Mott transition: The 1/r Hubbard chain, Physical Review B 51, 1993(R) (1995)

== Co-authors ==
Among his co-authors on work on conjugated polymers, other one-dimensional systems, and the Hubbard model are Alan R. Bishop, David Kelly Campbell, Kazumi Maki, Sumit Mazumdar, José Manuel Pereira Carmelo, Cristiane de Morais Smith, and others.
