= Weder =

Surname list

Weder is a German language surname. It stems from the male given name Withar – and may refer to:

- Christoph Weder (1966), Swiss chemist
- Donald Weder (1947), American inventor and businessman
- Gustav Weder (1961), Swiss bobsledder

Andrew Weder (1963), American Special Effects Coordinator
