= Adolphe Merkle Institute =

Swiss nanotechnology research center

Coordinates: 46°47′34″N 7°09′17″E

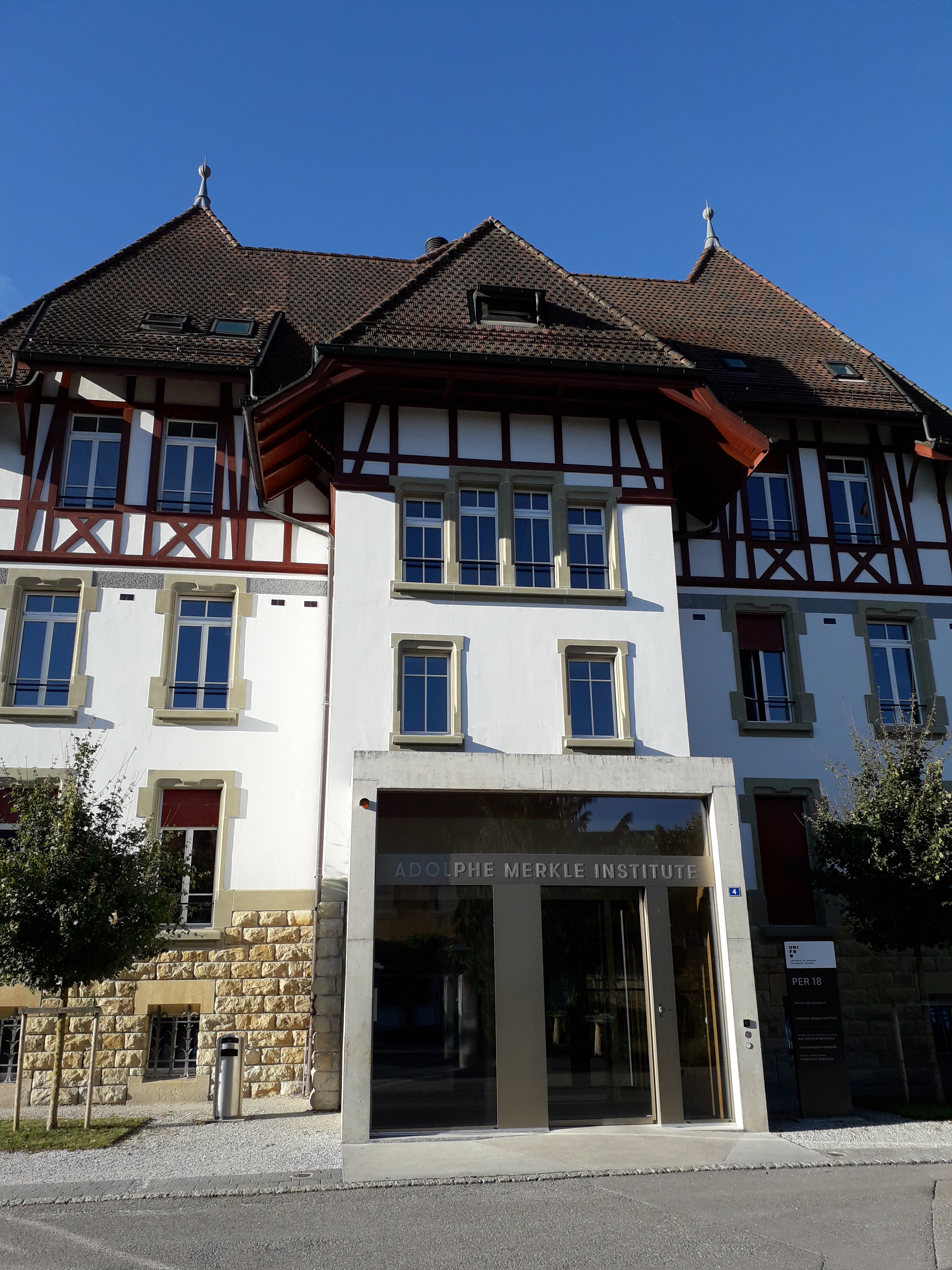
- Adolphe Merkle Institute
- Type: Research Institute
- Established: 2008
- Academic affiliations: University of Fribourg; Faculty of Science and Medicine
- Director: Hans Jörg Limbach
- Academic staff: ca. 90 (as of 2023) (40% women, 60% men)
- Location: Fribourg, Switzerland
- Website: ami.swiss
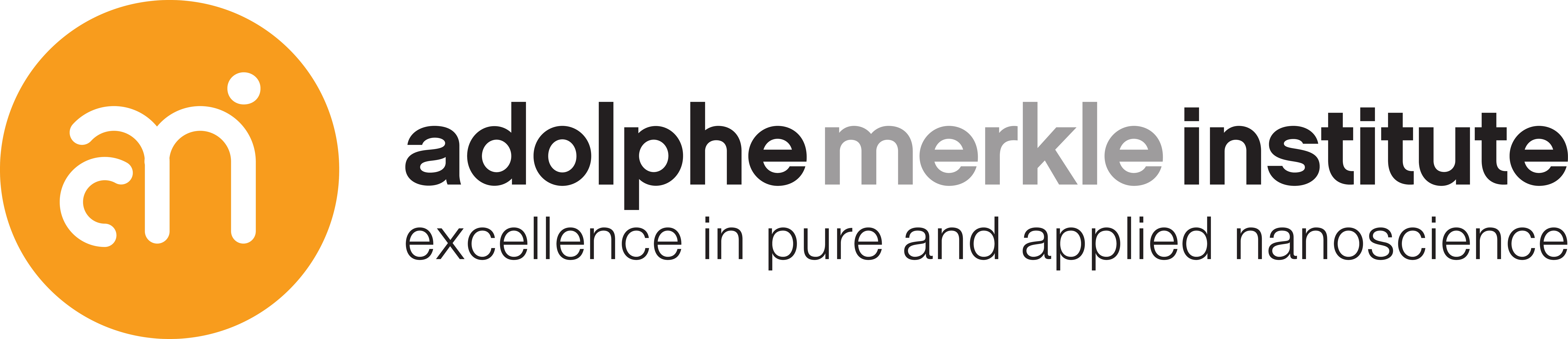

The Adolphe Merkle Institute (AMI) is a research center in Fribourg, Switzerland focused on nanoscience. The institute is named after the Swiss entrepreneur Adolphe Merkle who created the foundation that partially funded the institute.

== History ==
Dr. Adolphe Merkle, an entrepreneur from Fribourg, established the Adolphe Merkle Foundation in 2007 with the goal of strengthening research and teaching at the University of Fribourg. His contribution of 100 million Swiss francs constitutes one of the most important private donations to support academic research in Switzerland.

In 2008, the Adolphe Merkle Institute was founded under its first director, Prof. Peter Schurtenberger, formerly a professor in the Department of Physics at the University of Fribourg and then appointed as the chair of Experimental Physics and Nanoscience at the Institute. He developed the vision of an interdisciplinary institute that focuses on soft nanomaterials and combines fundamental and application-oriented research. In 2010, Prof. Christoph Weder, who joined AMI as the chair for Polymer Chemistry and Materials in 2009, became director, serving until April 2022. Prof. Schurtenberger left the institute to establish a new group at the University of Lund. he institute appointed Professors Alke Fink and Barbara Rothen-Rutishauser as co-chairs of BioNanomaterials, Prof.Ullrich Steiner was appointed as Professor of Soft Matter Physics, and Prof. Michael Mayer as Professor of Biophysics. Steiner took over as institute director in May 2022, followed by Prof. Hans Jörg Limbach, who was appointed as the institute's Chair of Food Science and Technology the previous year, in June 2026.

Since 2014, AMI is located on the University of Fribourg's Pérolles campus. The Institute is housed in two renovated buildings that were previously a private clinic and an additional modern construction.

== Structure ==
AMI is an interdisciplinary research center, focused on fundamental and application-oriented research in soft nano- and materials sciences.

The institute is headed by an executive director and executive board, who report to a scientific advisory board and institute council. Administrative structures are said to be kept lean and AMI employs an industry liaison and technology transfer office for partners from industry and academia, and a communications officer.

40% of AMI staff are doctoral students and 20% postdoctoral researchers.

The emphasis on interdisciplinarity is also reflected in how the research groups are constituted. They do not adhere to the traditional distinction of fields in the natural sciences but rather have interdisciplinary topics as their research focus.

The principal investigators of the research groups have full professorships at the University of Fribourg's Faculty of Science and Medicine. They teach at the Master's level but have a decreased teaching load in order to dedicate more time towards research activities at AMI.

=== Current Research Groups ===
- Polymer Chemistry & Materials (Prof. Christoph Weder)
- BioNanomaterials (Prof. Alke Fink and Prof. Barbara Rothen-Rutishauser)
- Biophysics (Prof. Michael Mayer)
- Food Science and Technology (Prof. Hanjo Limbach)
- Soft Matter Physics (Prof. Ullrich Steiner)
- Mechanoresponsive Materials (Prof. Jessica Clough)
- Quantum Sensing & Spin Chemistry (Prof. John Abendroth)

=== Former Research Groups ===
- Soft Nanoscience 2008-2010 (Prof. Peter Schurtenberger)
- Nanoparticle Self-Assembly 2012-2017 (Prof. Marco Lattuada)
- Macromolecular Chemistry 2013-2018 (Prof. Nico Bruns)
- Smart Energy Materials 2021-2024 (Prof. Jovana Milić)

== Research Activities ==
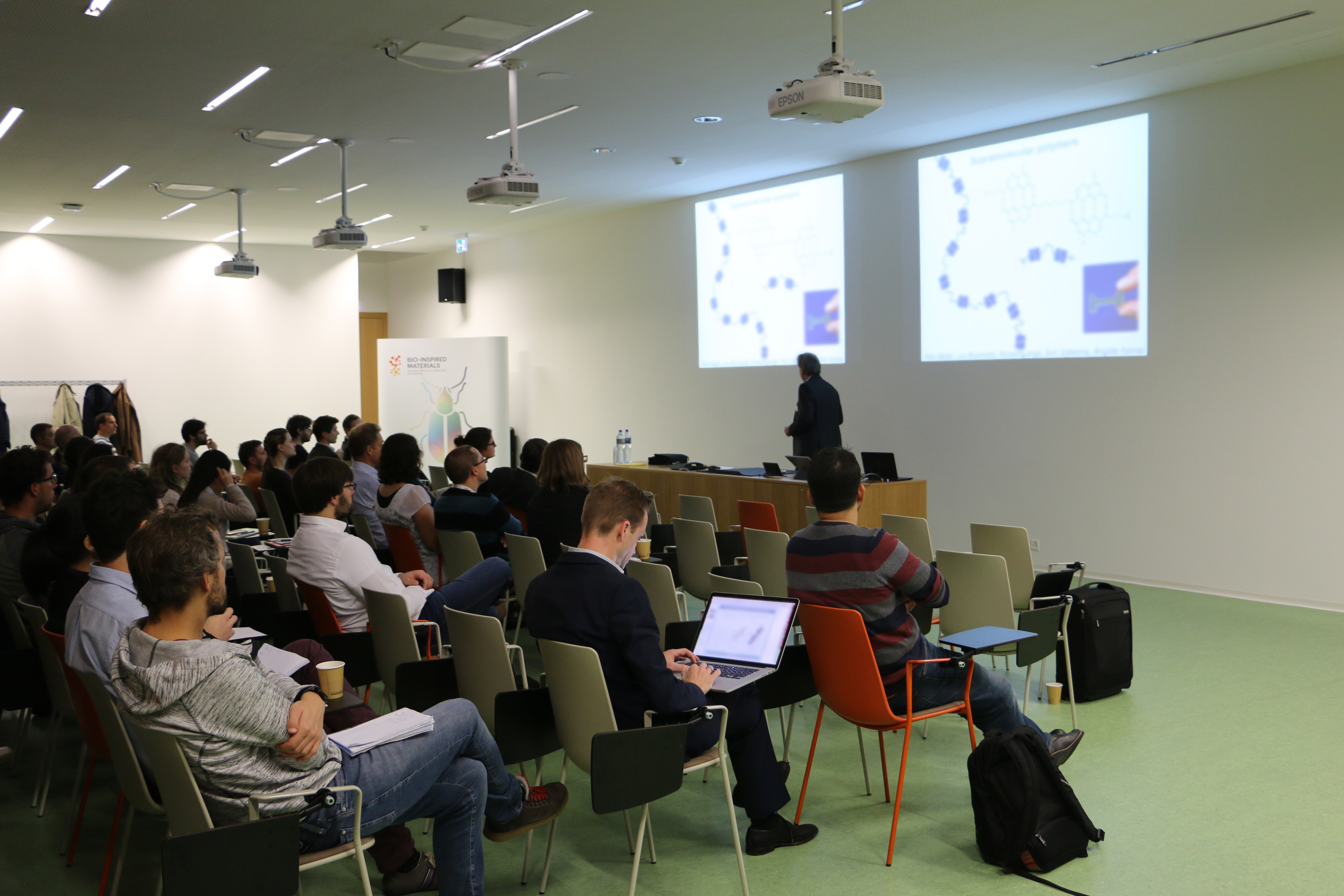
Conference talk at AMI

AMI's research revolves around soft nanomaterials, such as such as nanoparticles, colloids, polymers, nanostructures, and nanopores, and emphasizes bio-inspired materials design, stimuli-responsive materials, optical materials, energy materials, sensing, the detection of nanoparticles in complex media, and the investigation of the interactions of nanomaterials with biological systems.

The Polymer Chemistry & Materials group is conducting research on stimuli-responsive or smart polymers, supramolecular systems, bio-inspired materials, nanocomposites, and polymer mechanochemistry.

The BioNanomaterials group's research focuses on bioprinting, hazard assessment of nanomaterials, nanoparticle analysis and nanobiomechanics.

The BioPhysics group's research includes nanopores for single molecule analysis, bio-inspired voltage generation and pore forming peptides.

The Soft Matter Physics group is investigating and manufacturing nanostructured materials made by polymer self-assembly, energy materials for solar cells and batteries, photonic and plasmonic effects arising from structured materials, bio-inspired materials and surfaces.

The Food Science and Technology group, created in 2025, operates at the intersection of physics, chemistry, and biotechnology, notably through the development of food materials and their characterization.

The Mechanoresponsive Materials Group focuses on developing optical probes for polymers and soft matter, particularly for the detection of mechanical damage in these materials, using high-resolution microscopy techniques and bio-inspired approaches.

The Quantum Sensing & Spin Chemistry group, funded by an ERC starting grant, focuses on the use of quantum sensors to investigate chiral‑induced spin selectivity, at the intersection of physics, chemistry and biology.

In 2023 the institute had 40 active research projects. Topics of investigation include color generation in insects, soft worm-like robots, the development of guidelines for nanomaterials waste disposal, artificial muscles, squid-inspired materials damage detection, and electric eel-inspired membranes.

== Education ==
Master's students begin working in the AMI laboratories early in the program, and may also join one of the research groups for their master's thesis.

A summer internship program for undergraduate students from universities around the world is also present and is run in collaboration with the National Center of Competence in Research (NCCR) Bio-Inspired Materials of the Swiss National Science Foundation (SNF).

== Collaborations ==
AMI is conducting both fundamental as well as application-oriented research in the field of soft nanomaterials, receiving part of its funding through industrial partnerships. In 2018 AMI spawned its first startup NanoLockin.

=== NCCR Bio-Inspired Materials ===
AMI is involved with and headquarters the National Center of Competence in Research Bio-Inspired Materials, an interdisciplinary center for research and education around materials inspired by nature.

=== Biointegrable Soft Actuators Alimented by Metabolic Energy (INTEGRATE) ===
INTEGRATE is a multidisciplinary research program funded by the European Innovation Council and the Swiss Secretariat for Education, Research, and Innovation. The main goal is to develop energy-autonomous prosthetics and robotic devices, and counts with the participation of the Eindhoven University of Technology, the University of Rome Tor Vergata, the CNRS, VELTHA and the Adolphe Merkle Institute.

== Former collaborations ==
=== Partnerships for International Research and Education (PIRE) ===
PIRE was a collaboration between AMI, Case Western Reserve University, the University of Delaware, the University of Chicago, and the University of California at San Diego. The program was funded by the National Science Foundations of Switzerland and the US. Its focus lied on developing functional materials inspired by desirable substances in nature.

=== Plant-inspired Materials and Surfaces (PlaMatSu) ===
The European Commission funded PlaMatSu as an Innovative Training Network (ITN) under the Horizon 2020 Marie Sklodowska-Curie Actions with nine PhD students at University of Fribourg (Switzerland) and AMI, University of Freiburg (Germany), and University of Cambridge. As industrial partners the ITN included BASF SE (Germany), Fischerwerke GmbH & Co. KG (Germany), and Dr. Tillwich GmbH (Germany), as well as VDI - The Association of German Engineers and Wikimedia CH as communication partners.

=== CityCare ===
CityCare was another ITN funded by the European Commission under the Horizon 2020 Marie Sklodowska-Curie Actions with three PhD students. The projects investigated the damaging effects of air pollutants on the skin.

=== PATROLS ===
PATROLS (Physiologically Anchored Tools for Realistic nanOmateriaL hazard aSsessment) was an international project funded by the European Union through the Horizon 2020 research and innovation program with the objective to develop tools and techniques to predict potential hazards for humans and the environment from engineered nanomaterials in order to minimize the necessity of animal testing and categorize nanomaterials according to their health and safety risks.

=== ULtrafine particles from TRansportation – Health Assessment of Sources (ULTRHAS) ===
The EU-funded ULTRHAS brought together partners from Norway, Finland, Germany, and the Adolphe Merkle Institute with the goal to reveal the health threats posed by nanoparticles from different transport sources, and provide guidance for policy development to improve air quality and health.

== See also ==
- University of Fribourg
- Fribourg
