= Christoph Weder =

Swiss scientist

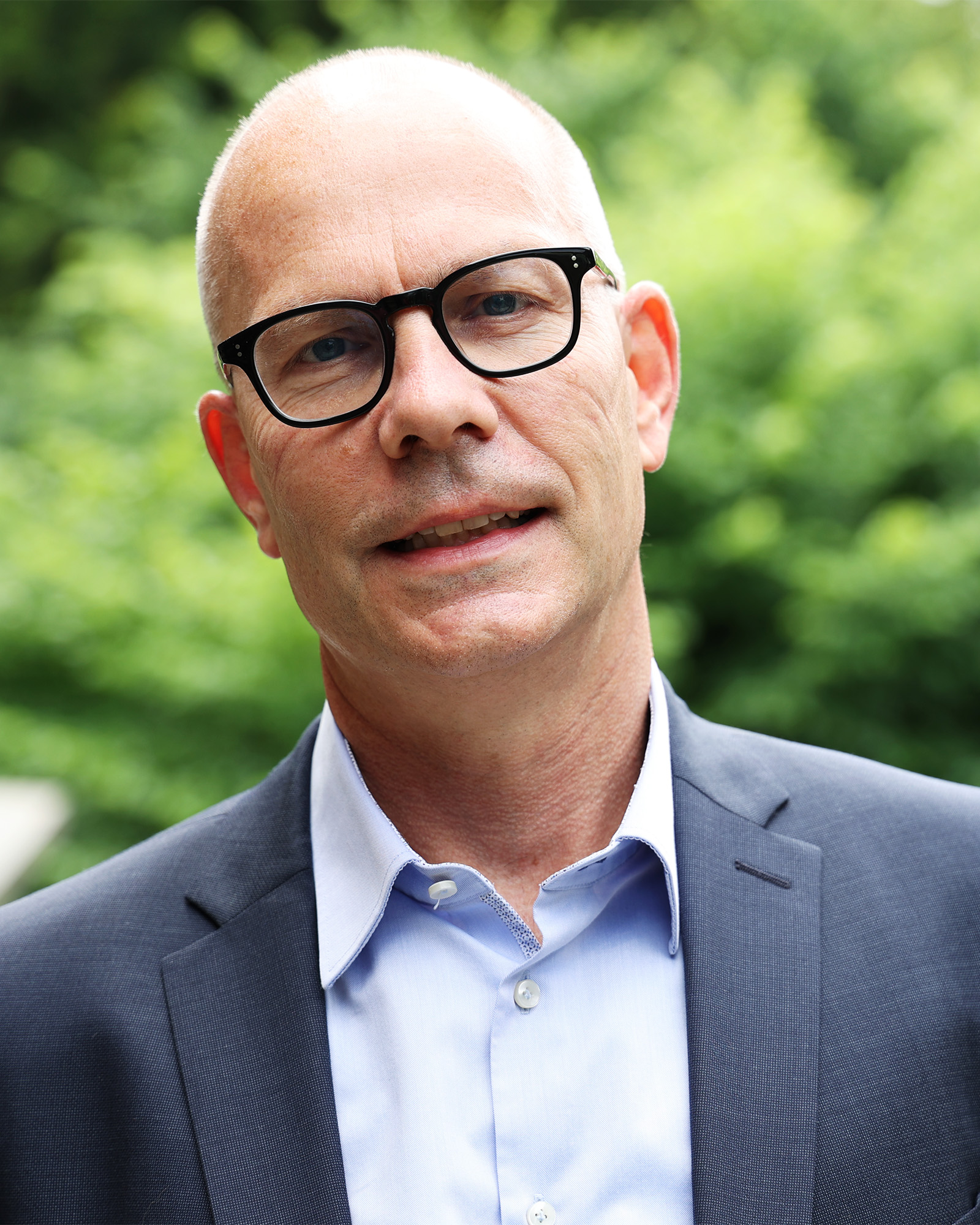
- Weder, Adolphe Merkle Institute, University of Fribourg
- Born: July 30, 1966 (age 60)
- Citizenship: Swiss and Irish
- Education: ETH Zurich
- Scientific career
- Fields: Polymer Science
- Workplaces: Adolphe Merkle Institute (current); Case Western Reserve University (2001-2009); ETH Zurich (1995-2000); Massachusetts Institute of Technology (1994-1995)
- Thesis: New Polyamides with Stable Nonlinear Optical Properties
- Academic advisors: Ulrich W. Suter, Mark S. Wrighton and Paul Smith
- Website: https://www.ami.swiss/en/groups/polymer-chemistry-and-materials/people/person.html?personid=122

Christoph Weder is the former director of the Adolphe Merkle Institute (AMI) at the University of Fribourg, Switzerland, and a professor of polymer chemistry and materials. He is best known for his work on stimuli-responsive polymers, polymeric materials that change one or more of their properties when exposed to external cues. His research is focused on the development, investigation, and application of functional materials, in particular stimuli-responsive and bio-inspired polymers.

== Education and career ==
Christoph Weder was born on July 30, 1966. He began elementary school in Mülheim a. Main, Germany, in 1972 before moving to Thalwil, Switzerland, in 1974, where he completed elementary and secondary school. He then attended the high school Kantonsschule Enge in Zurich, from which he graduated in 1985. Following in the footsteps of his father, who was also a polymer chemist, Weder studied chemistry at the Swiss Federal Institute of Technology (ETH Zurich) in Zurich, where he received his diploma in chemistry in 1990. He then joined the research group of Professor Ulrich W. Suter as a doctoral student and in 1994 was awarded the degree of Doctor of Natural Sciences for his dissertation "New Polyamides with Stable Nonlinear Optical Properties." While at ETH, Weder was also trained as a chemistry teacher and received his teaching certification in 1992. With a fellowship from the Swiss National Science Foundation, Weder then spent one year as a postdoctoral research fellow in the Department of Chemistry at the Massachusetts Institute of Technology, where he worked under the guidance of then-provost Mark S. Wrighton.

Weder returned to the Department of Materials of ETH Zurich in 1995, where he joined the group of Professor Paul Smith and continued to work on photofunctional polymers. Based on his habilitation thesis entitled "Polarizing Light with Polymers," Weder received his habilitation and, bestowed with the venia legendi, became an independent lecturer in 1999. In 2001, Weder left ETH and joined Case Western Reserve University in Cleveland, Ohio, as an associate professor in the Department of Macromolecular Science and Engineering. He was promoted to professor in 2007, and in 2008 was named the F. Alex Nason Professor.

In 2009, Weder returned to Switzerland and joined the Adolphe Merkle Institute (AMI) as Professor of Polymer Chemistry and Materials. AMI, which was founded in 2008 thanks to a gift from Adolphe Merkle, is an interdisciplinary research center that focuses on fundamental and application-oriented research in soft nano- and materials sciences. In January 2010, Weder was appointed as the institute's director, serving until April 2022.

Weder led a team that was awarded a grant from the Swiss National Science Foundation (SNSF) to establish the National Competence Center in Research (NCCR) Bio-Inspired Materials. He served as the center's director from its launch in 2014 until 2020. The NCCRs are a research instrument of the Swiss National Science Foundation (SNSF) that aim to strengthen research in areas of strategic importance for the future of Swiss science, business and society.

Weder remains an adjunct professor at CWRU and has served as a visiting professor at Chulalongkorn University in Bangkok, Thailand since 2003. He serves as an associate editor of ACS Macro Letters and was a co-editor of the RSC Book Series Polymer Chemistry from 202-2021.

Weder has co-authored more than 300 peer-reviewed articles in scientific journals and over twenty book chapters. He also edited two books. As of March 2022, Weder has an h-index of 87 and his works have been cited more than 27,000 times.

Weder is a co-inventor of more than twenty patent families that protect technologies such as light-polarizing security features, mechanochromic materials, sea-cucumber inspired dynamic mechanical polymer nanocomposites, stimuli-responsive supramolecular polymers, materials for optical upconversion, shape memory polymers, and optical data storage systems. He was a co-founding board member of the ETH-spinoff company Omlidon Technologies, LLC (1999–2002), and served on the board of directors of Gel Instrumente AG (1994–2006).

Weder is the recipient of a 3M Non-Tenured Faculty Award, a DuPont Young Professor Award, an NSF Special Creativity Award, and the Case School of Engineering Award. He was awarded a prestigious European Research Council (ERC) Advanced Grant, and is a Fellow of the American Chemical Society's Division of Polymer Chemistry. In 2017, he was nominated as a member of the Swiss Academy of Technical Sciences "in recognition of his pioneering work in the development of nanomaterials through combination of fundamental research and practical applications as well as his contribution to the successful establishment of the Adolphe Merkle Institute".

Weder is married and has three children.

== Research ==
Weder's early research activities in the 1990s focused on polymers with special optical properties. This involved the development of nonlinear optical polymers and investigations of the structure-property relationships of photoluminescent poly(p-phenylene ethynylene)s. He demonstrated the usefulness of these semiconducting polymers as the active layer in polymer-based light-emitting diodes. His group also exploited the possibility to orient such rod-like molecules to create fluorescent materials that display linearly polarized absorption and emission. Such materials formed the basis of security features that Weder's group developed, which were used as an anti-counterfeiting element in security paper. His team also discovered a light-polarizing energy transfer effect that can be used to produce highly efficient fluorescent polarizers. Such elements are useful in display and other applications.

Weder's research focus turned to stimuli-responsive polymers shortly after he moved to CWRU in 2001. In 2002, Weder's research lab developed a novel method to create polymeric materials that change their fluorescence color upon deformation. Recognizing the potential for practical applications this effect had, Weder established a research program to develop polymers that translate mechanical forces into optical signals, which is still active today, and shortly thereafter, mechanochromic polymers began to attract widespread interest. Most of the mechanochrochromic materials reported by Weder's group in the following two decades operate on the basis of the same general transduction principle, which involves changing the interactions among optically active motifs in response to mechanical deformation. Recent discoveries include the development of new mechanically responsive motifs or "mechanophores" based on rotaxanes and loop-forming dye pairs.

Controlling the interactions between molecular or nanoscale building blocks through an external stimulus has become one of Weder's main design tools for the creation of stimuli-responsive polymers. In 2008, in collaboration with his colleague Stuart Rowan, Weder introduced stimuli-responsive mechanically adaptive polymer nanocomposites whose architecture and function was inspired by sea cucumbers. The mechanical properties of these materials, which were made by incorporating nanocellulose crystals as a reinforcing filler into polymer matrices, depend on the interactions among the cellulose nanocrystals (CNCs), and can be regulated by an external stimulus. The approach was initially used to create mechanically morphing implant materials, which soften upon exposure to physiological conditions. This work led to sustained research efforts in Weder's group on bio-inspired mechanically morphing polymers, the development of protocols for the processing of CNC/polymer nanocomposites, and the development of new cellulose-based nanocomposites. Adaptive polymers that show such mechanical morphing upon exposure to physiological conditions were reported to increase the functionality of cortical implants.

The possibility to heal defects in polymeric materials can increase the reliability and durability of polymer products. In 2011, also in collaboration with Rowan, Weder demonstrated that the UV-light induced temporary disassembly of metallosupramolecular polymers can be used to heal defects in these materials. Expanding on this concept, Weder's team introduced light healable nanocomposites, and modified the structure to include different binding motifs and architectures, for example glassy hydrogen-bonded supramolecular polymer networks. His group also used this approach to develop adhesives with the capability to bond or debond on demand. Weder's group sought to push the mechanical properties of supramolecular polymers towards those of conventional thermoplastics. In 2019, his team demonstrated that it is possible to toughen stiff but brittle glassy supramolecular polymer networks by forming blends with a rubbery component. More recent versions of such materials were shown to be healable and to display property combinations that are comparable to some conventional plastics.
