= Electrochemical AFM =

Electrochemical AFM (EC-AFM) is a particular type of scanning probe microscopy (SPM), which combines the classical atomic force microscopy (AFM) together with electrochemical measurements. EC-AFM allows to perform in-situ AFM measurements in an electrochemical cell, in order to investigate the actual changes in the electrode surface morphology during electrochemical reactions. The solid-liquid interface is thus investigated. This technique was developed for the first time in 1996 by Kouzeki et al., who studied amorphous and polycrystalline thin films of naphthalocyanine on indium tin oxide in a solution of 0.1 M potassium chloride (KCl). Unlike the electrochemical scanning tunneling microscope, previously developed by Itaya and Tomita in 1988, the tip is non-conductive and it is easily steered in a liquid environment.

== Principles and experimental precautions ==
The technique consists in an AFM apparatus integrated with a three electrode electrochemical cell.

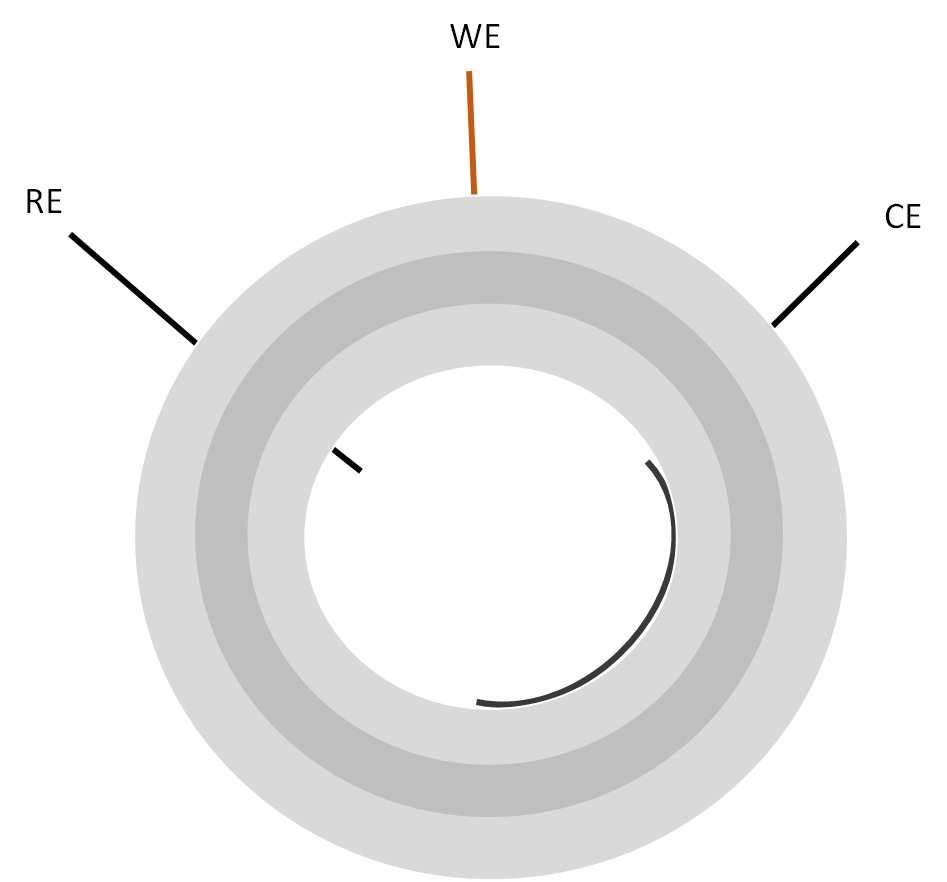
Schematic of the electrochemical cell

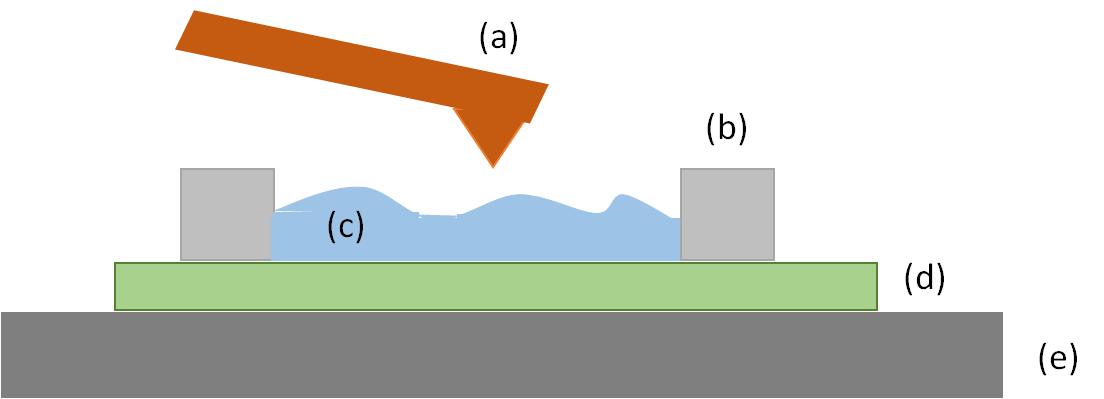
Electrochemical AFM section. (a) Cantilever and tip (b) Electrochemical cell (c) Liquid (electrolyte) (d) Sample (e) Sample holder. The electrochemical connections are usually placed under the sample holder.

The sample works as working electrode (WE) and must be conductive. The AFM probe is a "passive" element, as it is unbiased and it monitors the surface changes as a function of time, when a potential is applied to the sample. Several electrochemical experiments can be performed on the sample, such as cyclic voltammetry, pulse voltammetry etc. During the potential sweeping, the current flows through the sample and the morphology is monitored.

The electrochemical cell is made of a plastic material resistant to various chemical solvents (e.g. sulfuric acid, perchloric acid etc.), with a good mechanical resistance and low fabrication costs. In order to satisfy these requirements, various materials can be employed, such as polytetrafluoroethylene (PTFE) or teflon. Platinum and AgCl wires are widely employed as reference electrode and platinum wires as counter electrode.

Since the measurement is performed in a liquid environment, in which the cantilever is fully immersed, some precautions must be taken. The chosen electrolyte must be transparent, in order to allow the laser beam to reach cantilever and be deflected. For the right electrolyte opacity, depending on the solute concentration, very diluted solutions should be selected. The choice of a suitable electrolyte for the measurement must be taken considering also possible corrosion effects on the AFM scanner, which can be affected by strong acid solutions. The same problem affects the AFM cantilever. It is preferable to select an AFM tip with a specific coating resistant to acids, for example gold. The liquid environment adds one more constraint related to the choice of the tip material, as the laser sum registered on the photodiode must be scarcely affected. The change in the refractive index of the solution with respect to air leads to a change in the position of the laser spot, necessitating a repositioning of the photodiode.

== Applications ==
EC-AFM has various applications, where monitoring the electrode surface during electrochemical reactions leads to interesting results. Among the applications, the studies on battery and electrode corrosion in acid environment are widely spread. Concerning batteries, studies on lead–acid battery pointed out the change in the morphology during the reduction/oxidation cycles in a CV, when an acid electrolyte is used. Different corrosion effects are widely considered for the applications of EC-AFM. Different phenomena are studies, from pitting corrosion of steel, to crystal dissolution. Highly oriented pyrolytic graphite (HOPG) is widely employed as an electrode for EC-AFM. In fact, various surface phenomena are studied, from the application to lithium batteries to anion intercalation leading to blister formation on the electrode surface. One application is the EC-AFM dip pen nanolithography. Recently, SPM based lithography gained attention due to its simplicity and precise control the structure and location. A new development of this technique is the dip pen nanolithography (DPN), which uses the AFM technique to deliver organic molecules on different substrates, as gold. Using EC-AFM allows to fabricate metal and semiconductor nanostructures on the WE, gaining high thermal stability and a higher chemical diversity. Finally, it is possible to perform and study the electrodeposition of different materials on electrodes, from metals (i.e. copper) to polymers, such as polyaniline (PANI).
