= Bimodal atomic force microscopy =

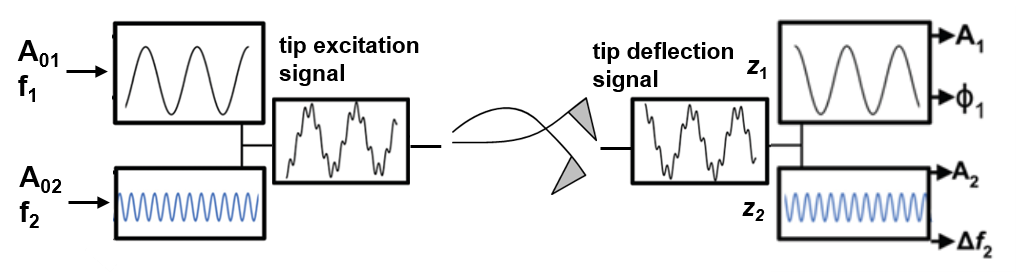
Excitation and detection scheme in bimodal AFM. The cantilever is excited at its first two eigenmodes with frequencies $f_1$ and $f_2$. Upon interaction with the sample, the components of the tip's response are processed. The topography is obtained by keeping $A_1$= constant. In a bimodal AM-FM configuration, two feedback loops act on the 2nd mode. One keeps $A_2$ fixed while a phase-lock loop keeps $\phi_2=90^o$.

Bimodal Atomic Force Microscopy (bimodal AFM) is an advanced atomic force microscopy technique characterized by generating high-spatial resolution maps of material properties. Topography, deformation, elastic modulus, viscosity coefficient or magnetic field maps might be generated. Bimodal AFM is based on the simultaneous excitation and detection of two eigenmodes (resonances) of a force microscope microcantilever.

== History ==
Numerical and theoretical considerations prompted the development of bimodal AFM. The method was initially thought to enhance topographic contrast in air environments. Three subsequent advances such as the capability to detect non-topography properties such electrostatic and magnetic interactions; imaging in liquid and ultra-high vacuum and its genuine quantitative features set the stage for further developments and applications.

== Principles of Bimodal AFM ==
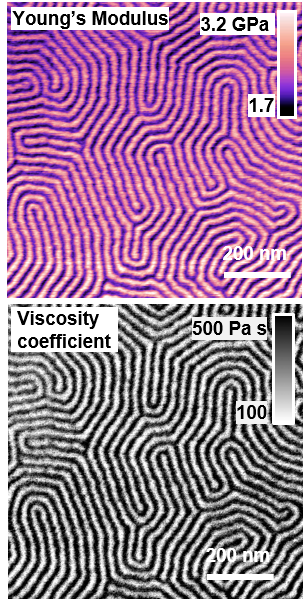
Nanomechanical maps of a polymer blend generated by bimodal AFM. Young's modulus (top) and viscosity coefficient (bottom) maps of a PS-b-PMMA block co-polymer. The stiffer domains (PMMA) show a lower viscosity coefficient and a faster response time.

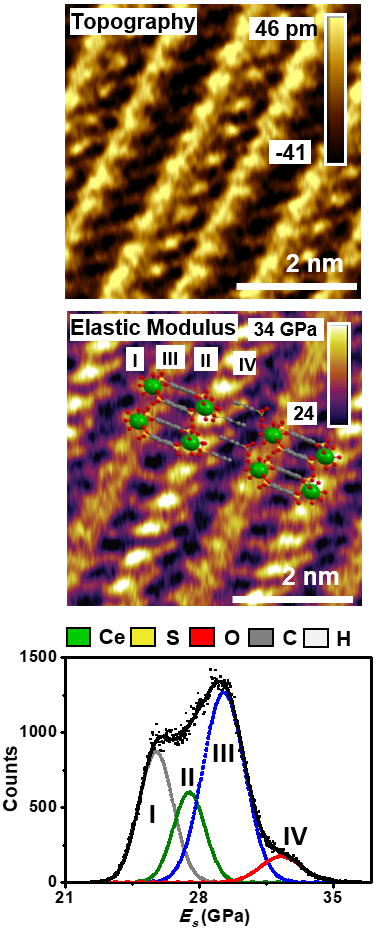
Angstrom-scale resolution. Topography (top) and elastic modulus (middle) maps of metal-organic-framework (MOF). The MOF structure on the basal plane is being overlaid. Angstrom-scale variations of the elastic modulus are associated with the chemical structure of the MOF. Distribution of the elastic modulus values. Data obtained from the middle map (bottom). The curve can be decomposed in four individual Gaussian curves, centered respectively, at 25.7, 27.5, 29.3 and 32.3 GPa.

The interaction of the tip with the sample modifies the amplitudes, phase shifts and frequency resonances of the excited modes. Those changes are detected and processed by the feedback of the instrument. Several features make bimodal AFM a very powerful surface characterization method at the nanoscale. (i) Resolution. Atomic, molecular or nanoscale spatial resolution was demonstrated. (ii) Simultaneity. Maps of different properties are generated at the same time. (iii) Efficiency. A maximum number of four data points per pixel are needed to generate material property maps. (iv) Speed. Analytical solutions link observables with material properties.

=== Configurations ===
In AFM, feedback loops control the operation of the microscope by keeping a fixed value a parameter of the tip's oscillation. If the main feedback loop operates with the amplitude, the AFM mode is called amplitude modulation (AM). If it operates with the frequency shift, the AFM mode is called frequency modulation (FM). Bimodal AFM might be operated with several feedback loops. This gives rise to a variety of bimodal configurations. The configurations are termed AM-open loop, AM-FM, FM-FM. For example, bimodal AM-FM means that the first mode is operated with an amplitude modulation loop while the 2nd mode is operated with a frequency modulation loop. The configurations might not be equivalent in terms of sensitivity, signal-to-noise ratio or complexity.

Let's consider the AM-FM configuration. The first mode is excited to reach free amplitude (no interaction) and the changes of its amplitude and phase shift are tracked by a lock-in amplifier. The main feedback loop keeps constant the amplitude, at a certain set-point $A_1$ by modifying the tip vertical position (AM). In a nanomechanical mapping experiment, $\phi_1$ must be kept below 90°, i.e., the AFM is operated in the repulsive regime. At the same time, an FM loop acts on the second eigenmode. A phase-lock-loop regulates the excitation frequency $f_2$ by keeping the phase shift of the second mode at 90°. An additional feedback loop might be used to maintain the amplitude $A_2$ constant.

=== Theory ===
The theory of bimodal AFM operation encompasses several aspects. Among them, the approximations to express the Euler-Bernoulli equation of a continuous cantilever beam in terms of the equations of the excited modes, the type of interaction forces acting on the tip, the theory of demodulation methods or the introduction of finite-size effects.

In a nutshell, the tip displacement in AFM is approximated by a point-mass model,

$\frac{k_i}{4\pi^2 f_i^2} \ddot{z_i} + \frac{k_i}{2\pi f_{0 i} Q} \dot{z_i} + k_i z_i = F_i \cos(2 \pi f_i t) + F_{ts} (t) \,$

where $f_i$, $f_0i$, $Q_i$, $k_i$, $F_i$, and $F_{ts}$ are, respectively, the driving frequency, the free resonant frequency, the quality factor, the stiffness, the driving force of the i-th mode, and the tip–sample interaction force. In bimodal AFM, the vertical motion of the tip (deflection) has two components, one for each mode,

$z(t) = z_0 +z_1(t)+z_2(t) \approx A_1 cos \left(2\pi f_1 t - \phi_1 \right) + A_2 cos \left(2\pi f_2 t - \frac{\pi}{2} \right) \,$

with $z_0$, $z_1$, $z_2$, as the static, the first, and the second mode deflections; $A_i$, $f_i$ and $\phi_i$ are, respectively, the amplitude, frequency and phase shift of mode i.

The theory that transforms bimodal AFM observables into material properties is based on applying the virial $V_i$ and energy dissipation $E_{diss}$ theorems to the equations of motion of the excited modes. The following equations were derived

$V_1= \frac{1}{T}\int_0^T F_{ts} (t) z_1(t) dt = - \frac{k_1 A_1 A_{01}}{2 Q_1} \cos{\phi_1} \,$

$V_2= \frac{1}{T}\int_0^T F_{ts} (t) z_2(t) dt \approx - \frac{k_2 A_2^2 \Delta f_2}{f_{02}} \,$

$E_{diss1}= \int_0^T F_{ts} (t) \dot{z}_1(t) dt = - \frac{\pi k_1 A_1 }{Q_1} (A_1 - A_{01}\sin(\phi_1)) \,$

where $T=T_1 T_2$ is a time where the oscillation of both modes are periodic; $Q_i$ the quality factor of mode i. Bimodal AFM operation might be involve any pair of eigenmodes. However, experiments are commonly performed by exciting the first two eigenmodes.

The theory of bimodal AFM provides analytical expressions to link material properties with microscope observables. For example, for a paraboloid probe (radius $R$) and a tip-sample force given by the linear viscoelastic Kelvin-Voigt model, the effective elastic modulus $E_{eff}$ of the sample, viscous coefficient of compressibility $\eta_{com}$, loss tangent $\tan \rho$ or retardation time $\tau$ are expressed by

$E_{eff} = 4 \sqrt{2} \frac{Q_1}{\sqrt{R}} \frac{k_2^2}{k_1} \frac{\Delta f_2^2}{f_{02}^2} \frac{A_1^{3/2}}{A_{01}^2-A_1^2} \,$

$\eta_{com} = \frac{E_{eff}}{\omega_1} \left[ \frac{A_{01}\sin{\phi_1}-A_1}{A_{01}\cos{\phi_1}} \right] \,$

$\tan \rho = 2 \pi \omega_1 \frac{\eta_{com}}{E_{eff}} = 2 \pi \omega_1 \tau \,$

For an elastic material, the second term of equation to calculate $\eta$ disappears because $A_1=A_{01} \sin{\phi_1}$ which gives $\eta = 0$. The elastic modulus is obtained from the equation above. Other analytical expressions were proposed for the determination of the Hamaker constant and the magnetic parameters of a ferromagnetic sample.

== Applications ==
Bimodal AFM is applied to characterize a large variety of surfaces and interfaces. Some applications exploit the sensitivity of bimodal observables to enhance spatial resolution. However, the full capabilities of bimodal AFM are shown in the generation of quantitative maps of material properties. The section is divided in terms of the achieved spatial resolution, atomic-scale or nanoscale.

=== Atomic and molecular-scale resolution ===
Atomic-scale imaging of graphene, semiconductor surfaces and adsorbed organic molecules were obtained in ultra high-vacuum. Angstrom-resolution images of hydration layers formed on proteins and Young's modulus map of a metal-organic frame work, purple membrane and a lipid bilayer were reported in aqueous solutions.

=== Material property applications ===
Bimodal AFM is widely used to provide high-spatial resolution maps of material properties, in particular, mechanical properties. Elastic and/or viscoelastic property maps of polymers, DNA, proteins, protein fibers, lipids or 2D materials were generated. Non-mechanical properties and interactions including crystal magnetic garnets, electrostatic strain, superparamagnetic particles and high-density disks were also mapped. Quantitative property mapping requires the calibration of the force constants of the excited modes.
