= Adolphe Merkle =

- Born: 5 October 1924; Düdingen, Switzerland
- Died: 22 February 2012 (aged 87); Fribourg, Switzerland
- Occupations: Economist, Sciences patron

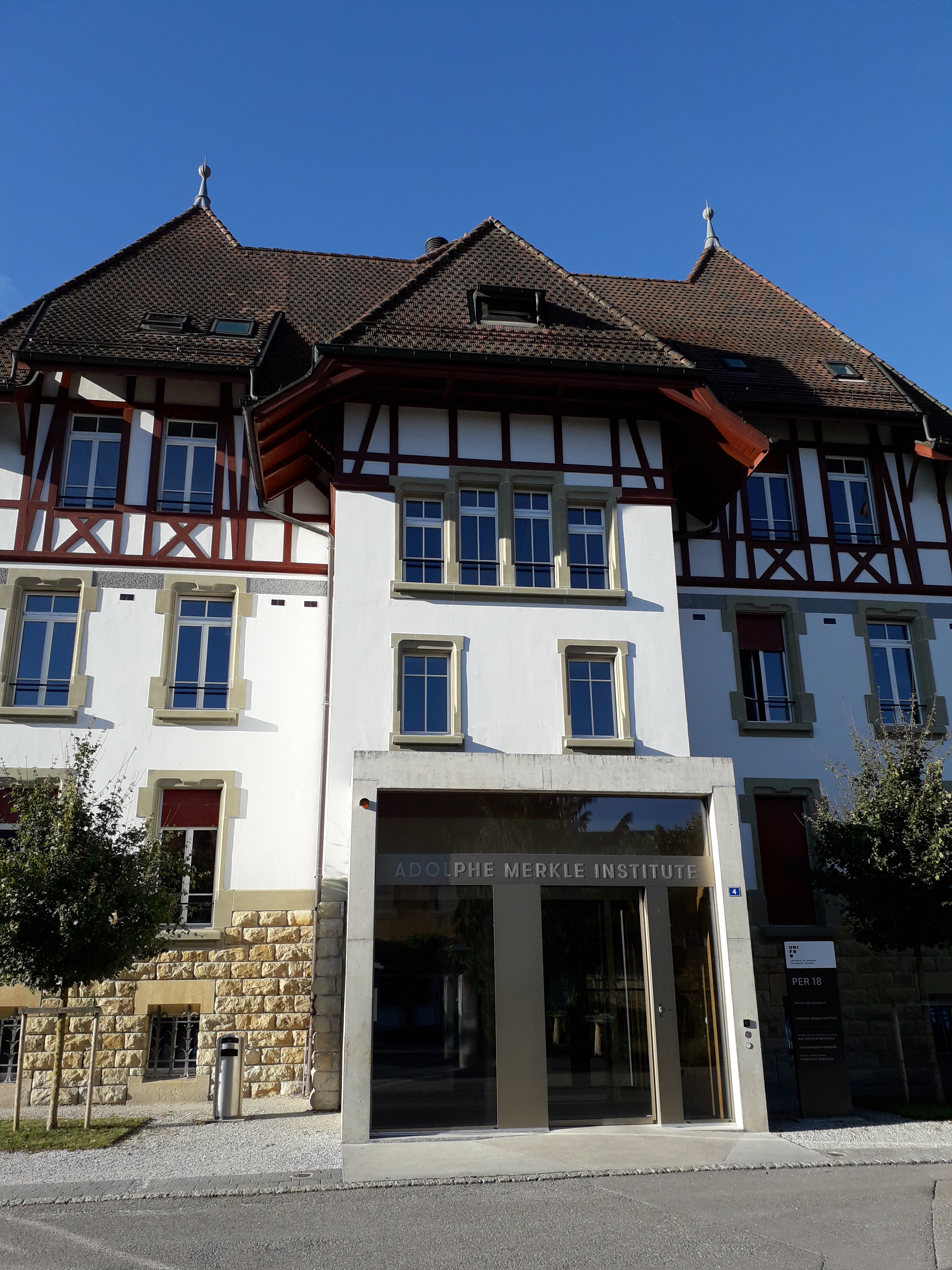
Adolphe Merkle Institute

Adolphe Merkle (5 October 1924 – 22 February 2012) was a Swiss entrepreneur and patron of the sciences.

== Career ==
Merkle completed his degree in economics in 1948 at the University of Fribourg and obtained his Ph.D. in 1950 under the supervision of Josef Schwarzfischer. At the age of 27 he went into the real estate business and discovered the company VibroMeter in Villars-sur-Glâne, which developed and fabricated measuring instruments. He became the sole shareholder and CEO of the company, that from the 1960s on manufactured with great success specialized instruments for the automobile and aviation industries and in 1990 for the heavy-lift rocket Ariane 5. In 1991 Merkle sold the majority of his share to Elektrowatt and retired from the company's management in 1998 after its sale to Meggitt PLC.

In 2007 Merkle made a donation of 100 million Swiss Francs to the University of Fribourg for the foundation of a research institute in nanotechnology and material sciences. Subsequently, he donated a further 10 million Swiss Francs to turn the former medical clinic Garcia in Fribourg (next to the Perolles campus of the university) into the research facility that is now named after him, the Adolphe Merkle Institute. The by Swiss standards extraordinary donation was the highest private donation to a university in Switzerland to date. The Adolphe-Merkle-Foundation, which he founded, is part of the institute council and promotes in many areas the institute's support of multilingualism or scientific awards. In 2003 Merkle was awarded an honorary doctorate by the University of Fribourg and together with his wife honorary citizenship by the Canton of Fribourg.

Merkle was married and father of a son who died in a car accident when he was young.
