= Elektrowatt =

Swiss electricity and industrial holding

- Formerly: Elektrobank (1895–1946)
- Type: Holding company
- Industry: Electricity, finance, industry
- Founded: 1895 in Zürich, Switzerland
- Founder: Allgemeine Elektricitäts-Gesellschaft (AEG)
- Defunct: 1998
- Fate: Split into Watt AG (energy) and Siemens Building Technologies (industrial)
- Headquarters: Zürich, Switzerland
- Products: Financing, construction, and operation of electricity companies; industrial goods
- Parent: AEG

Elektrowatt was a Swiss holding company based in Zürich. Founded in 1895 as Elektrobank to finance, build, and operate electricity companies, it later expanded into the industrial sector before being split up in 1998.

== History ==
The company was founded in 1895 in Zürich under the name Elektrobank by the Berlin firm Allgemeine Elektricitäts-Gesellschaft (AEG), which was seeking new markets. Constituted as a holding company, the bank's purpose was the financing, construction, and operation of electricity companies. At the outset its assets were invested mainly in Germany (50%) and Italy (20%). After the First World War the company had to be reorganized, with the capital reduced twice. Elektrobank subsequently reduced its commitments in Germany in favor of Spain, France, and the United States.

In view of the difficulties facing the international electricity market because of the Second World War, the company devoted itself more to developing power stations in the Swiss Alps. The adoption of the name Elektrowatt in 1946 gave effect to the strategy, already decided in 1935, of extending its activities into the industrial sector. Having become an industrial holding, Elektrowatt was no longer subject to the banking law. After taking a 51% stake in Electricité de Laufenbourg in 1969, it held a prominent place on the international market for the exchange and distribution of electric power. By 1975 it was investing only a third of its assets abroad. Elektrowatt also took holdings in the nuclear power stations at Gösgen and Leibstadt.

Although the industrial sector provided the greater part of turnover from 1985, the energy sector remained the most profitable. Annual profit rose from 2.8 million francs in 1947 to 212 million in 1993, a record still unequaled at the end of the 20th century. Credit Suisse remained the principal shareholder until 1998, when Elektrowatt was split into a German-Swiss energy holding (Watt AG) and an industrial holding incorporated into the German Siemens group under the name Siemens Building Technologies.

== Bibliography ==
- A. Steigmeier, Power on, 1995
- B. Bonhage, Unternehmerische Entscheidungen im Spannungsfeld gesamtwirtschaftlicher Entwicklungen, licentiate thesis, Zürich, 1998
