= Nanobiomechanics =

Field in nanoscience and biomechanics

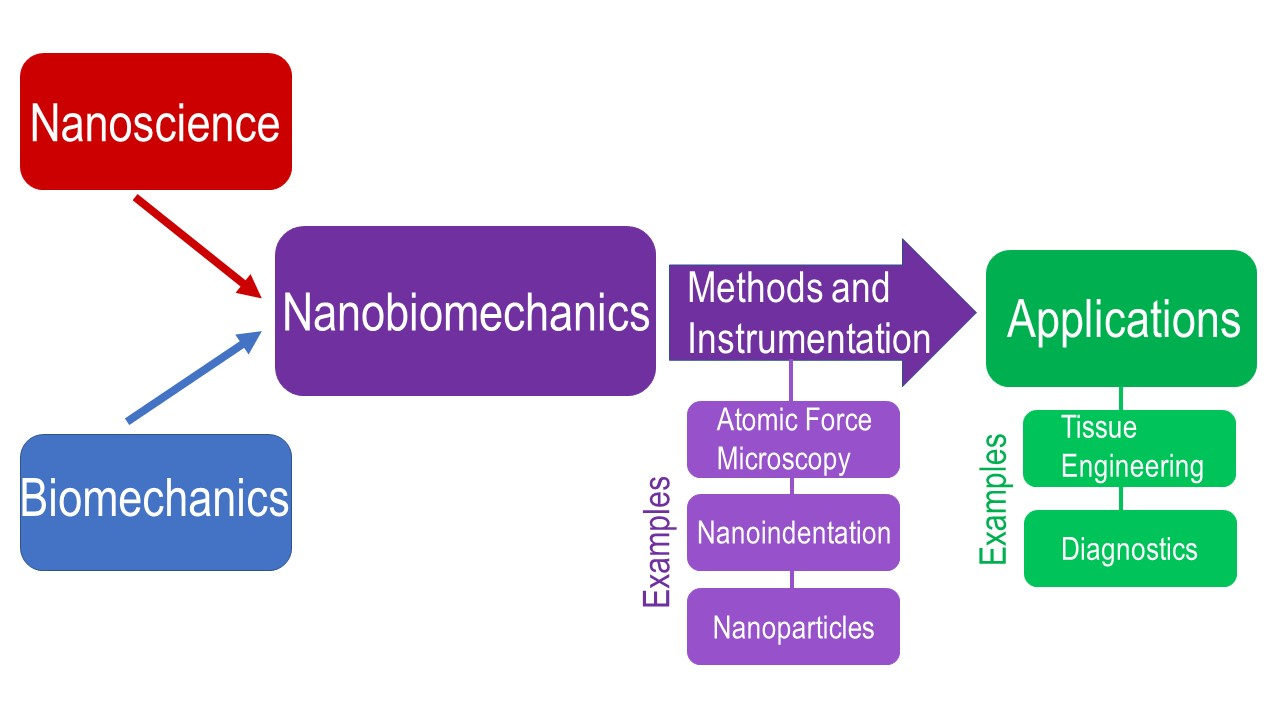
An overview of nanobiomechanics showing relevant fields. Examples of methods and instrumentation and applications are also included.

Nanobiomechanics (also bionanomechanics) is a field in nanoscience and biomechanics that combines the powerful tools of nanomechanics to explore fundamental science of biomaterials and biomechanics.

Since the introduction by its founder Yuan-Cheng Fung, the field of biomechanics has become one of the branches of mechanics and bioscience. For many years, biomechanics has examined tissue. Through advancements in nanoscience, the scale of the forces that could be measured and also the scale of observation of biomaterials was reduced to "nano" and "pico" level. Consequently, it became possible to measure the mechanical properties of biological materials at nanoscale. This is relevant to improve tissue engineering processes and cellular therapy.

Most of the biological materials have different hierarchical levels, and the smallest ones refer to the nanoscale. For example, bone has up to seven levels of biological organization, and the smallest level, i.e., single collagen fibril and hydroxylapatite minerals have dimensions well below 100 nm. Therefore, being able to probe properties at this small scales provides a great opportunity for better understanding the fundamental properties of these materials. For example, measurements have shown that nanomechanical heterogeneity exists even within single collagen fibrils as small as 100 nm.

One of the other most relevant topics in this field is measurement of tiny forces on living cells to recognize changes caused by different diseases, including disease progression. For example, it has been shown that red blood cells infected by malaria are 10 times stiffer than normal cells. Likewise, it has been shown that cancer cells are 70 percent softer than normal cells. Early signs of aging cartilage and osteoarthritis has been shown by looking at the changes in the tissue at the nanoscale.

== Methods, instrumentation, and application ==
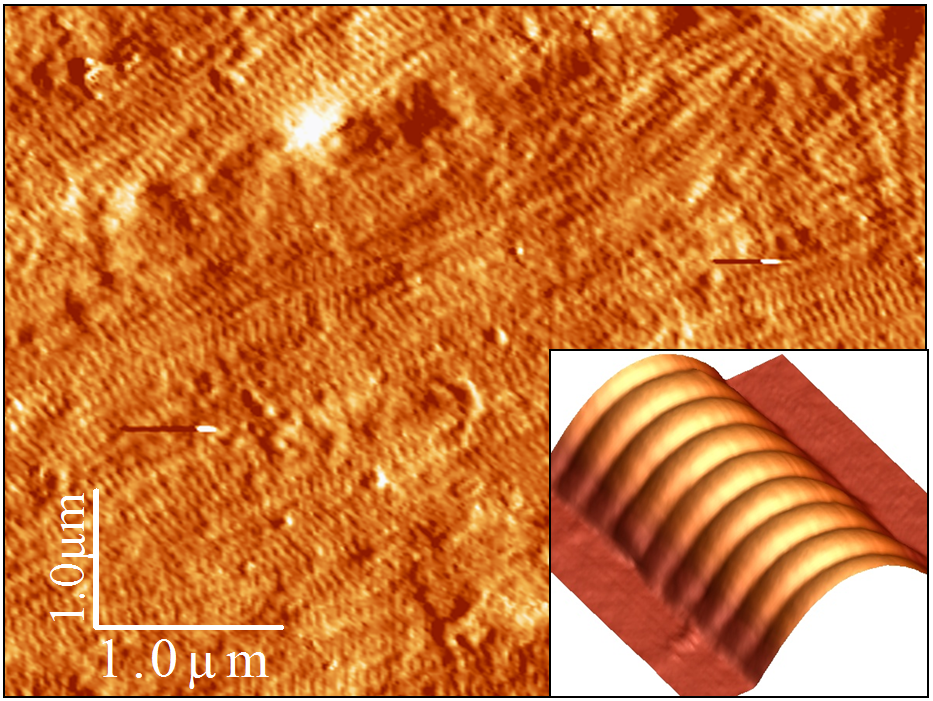
High resolution AFM image of cortical bone and single collagen fibril (inset)

The common methods in nanobiomechanics include atomic force microscopy (AFM), nanoindentation, and application of nanoparticles. These and other methods may be applied to relevant materials, for example: bone and its hierarchical constituents such as single collagen fibrils, single living cells, actin filaments and microtubules.

=== Atomic Force Microscopy ===
For a description of atomic force microscopy (AFM), see atomic force microscopy.

AFM has been used to study the nanoscale level of the cytoskeleton and its components, the extracellular matrix, and the cell's environment. Understanding the cell's mechanics, including at a nanoscale level, is highly connected to understanding these molecules and structures. As all of this affects how the cell behaves, it is beneficial for tissue engineering. One example of this is when researchers applied tapping mode AFM to study repair bone from genetically modified mesenchymal cells. Via this method, they were able to image structures in the bone on a nano scale that suggested collagen was present.

AFM has also been applied to measure the mechanical properties of proteins and other biomolecules in a variety of conditions through extension and compression experiments. Further, it has been applied to the mapping of cells' and membranes' mechanical properties, mechanotransduction, how cells adhere or detach based on the surface they are on and their own molecules, and the stiffness of cells.

As metastatic cells have been shown to be softer than benign cells using AFM, the mechanics of cancer cells may be useful to diagnose cancer.

=== Nanoindentation ===
For a description of nanoindentation, see nanoindentation.

Nanoindentation has been applied to biomechanical studies. One example studied repair bone from genetically modified mesenchymal cells. They compressed a probe with a nanometer radius into both native and repair bone and used it to study the deformability of the tissue. This gave them insight into mechanical properties of the bone, including its stiffness. Nanoindentation also allowed them to study the bone's compressibility through loading and unloading curves.

Further, nanoindentation may be combined with other methods in specific studies. One example is AFM nanoindentation, which has been applied to study subcellular components in living cells.

=== Nanoparticles ===
For a description of nanoparticles, see nanoparticles.

Nanoparticles both affect cells on a nanoscale level, and are one method of studying the mechanical properties of cells and biomaterials on the nanoscale level. Nanoparticles affect how cells adhere to substrates, and the cell's stiffness. They also impact components of the cell's cytoskeleton which in turn affect cell motility as they bind and interact with structures such as receptors and RNA.

As these nanoparticles affect the nanobiomechanics of cells, they are valuable tools to study them. For example, nanoparticles have been embedded on the surfaces of structures to alter the nanotopographical environment, and affected how the cell behaved. This included how cells spread, how cytoskeletal components assemble, and how cells attach. Some included nanoparticles have magnetic properties, and have been used in conjunction with magnetic fields for detailed control of cellular surfaces and other studies.

Nanoparticles are useful in studying the ways cells adapt physical forces into biochemical signals, and the mechanical properties of cellular constituents. They have also been used in processes such as particle tracking microrheology.
