= Andrea Marinelli =

Italian journalist

- Born: June 26, 1982 (age 43); Perugia, Umbria
- Occupation: Journalist

Andrea Marinelli (born June 26, 1982, Perugia) is a journalist for the Italian daily newspaper Corriere della Sera. At Corriere he works at the foreign desk and covers US news. Previously, he worked together with Milena Gabanelli in the investigative data-journalism project Dataroom. Marinelli lived in New York City for many years and wrote dozens of reportages from the United States. Before joining Corriere della Sera, he wrote for Il Sole 24 Ore, Il Manifesto, International Business Times and many other publications.

== Career ==
In 2012, Marinelli crowdfunded his way into the US presidential campaign traveling across the country by bus and hitchhiking while sleeping on strangers couches thanks to couchsurfing. On the experience he self-published a book, "L'ospite", in which he describes the US presidential elections through the lens of his traveling experience. In May 2013, he repeated the experience for Corriere della Sera, this time traveling from coast to coast in order to cover the Supreme Court decision on the Defense of Marriage Act. In October, Marinelli published for Corriere della Sera the e-book "Justice ha due padri", a reportage on same-sex marriage and the perception of homosexuality in the United States.

Among others, he interviewed presidential candidates Andrew Yang, Rick Santorum and Gary Johnson; economists Arthur Laffer and Richard D. Wolff; professors Allan Lichtman, Graham Allison, Larry Sabato and Larry Diamond; US representative Gil Cisneros; writers Don Winslow, Andrew Sean Greer, Rachel Kushner, Ben Marcus, Harry Hurt III, Ayelet Waldman and James Fadiman; journalists Amy Chozick and Andrew Sullivan; activists Kerry Kennedy and Robert Ellsberg; ultramarathon runner Pete Kostelnick

In 2013, Marinelli was selected among the "10 Italian writers of the future" from Festivaletteratura in Mantova. In 2014, Marinelli co-founded the data journalism magazine Peninsula Talks an award-winning digital platform blending data, video and text. The magazine was presented at the 14th Venice Architecture Biennale.

In 2017, Marinelli won the Indro Montanelli Writing Award. In 2020, he won the Premio Ussi for sportswriting, for a story on Megan Rapinoe.
