= Sandra Villines =

Ultramarathon runner

Sport
- Sport: Ultramarathon

Achievements and titles
- World finals: Second fastest run across the United States for a woman, 54 days, 16 hours, and 24 minutes

Sandra Villines is an ultramarathon runner who set the women's Trans America Run record in 2017. Running from San Francisco to New York City, Villines completed the approximately 3,100-mile route in 54 days, 16 hours, and 24 minutes. Her time broke the previous women's record set by South African Mavis Hutchinson, whose time was 69 days, 2 hours, and 40 minutes. Villines' record stood until November 2023, when Jenny Hoffman completed the run in 47 days, 12 hours, and 35 minutes.

Villines is also a Badwater Ultramarathon champion.
