= Francis Fahy =

Francis Fahy or Frank Fahy may refer to:

- Francis Fahy (songwriter) (1854–1935), Irish nationalist, songwriter and poet
- Frank Fahy (politician) (1879–1953), Irish Fianna Fáil politician
- Frank Fahy (physicist) (1922–2005), Irish physicist and university administrator

== See also ==
- Frank Fahey (disambiguation)
