= J. C. Séamus Davis =

Irish physicist (born 1961)

- Born: James Charles Séamus Davis; 22 March 1961 (age 65); Skibbereen, Ireland
- Education: University College Cork: BSc, Physics; University of California, Berkeley: Ph.D., Physics
- Known for: Quasiparticle interference imaging
- Awards: Fritz London Memorial Prize (2005); Kamerlingh Onnes Prize (2009); Olli V. Lounasmaa Memorial Prize (2020); Oliver E. Buckley Prize (2023); Michael Faraday Medal and Prize (2026)
- Scientific career
- Fields: Physics
- Workplaces: University of California, Berkeley; Cornell University; Brookhaven National Laboratory; University College Cork; University of Oxford
- Thesis: Superfluid ^{3}He in simple restricted geometries (1989)
- Academic advisors: Frank Fahy
- Doctoral students: Jenny Hoffman

James Charles Séamus Davis (born 22 March 1961) is an Irish physicist whose research explores the world of macroscopic quantum physics. Davis concentrates upon the fundamental physics of exotic states of electronic, magnetic, atomic and space-time quantum matter. A specialty is development of innovative instrumentation to allow direct atomic-scale visualisation or perception of the macroscopic quantum phenomena that are characteristic of these states.

Davis operates two suites of ultra-low vibration laboratories, one in Beecroft Building at University of Oxford in the United Kingdom, another in the Kane Building at University College Cork in Ireland.

== Biography ==
Born in 1961 in Skibbereen, County Cork, Ireland, Davis was admitted to University College Cork (UCC) in 1978 to study physics under Frank Fahy, graduating with a Bachelor of Science in 1983. He received a Doctor of Philosophy in Physics from the University of California, Berkeley, in 1989. He became a postdoctoral research associate at UC Berkeley the following year, and joined the faculty in 1993. He was appointed Professor of Physics in 2000.

From 1998 to 2002, Davis was a faculty physicist at Lawrence Berkeley National Laboratory. He then joined Cornell University as Professor of Physics in 2003, and was appointed J.G. White Distinguished Professor of Physics in 2008. In 2007, he became SUPA Distinguished Professor of Physics at the University of St Andrews. He joined Brookhaven National Laboratory in 2007 as a senior physicist, and in 2009 was appointed director of DOE's Center for Emergent Superconductivity. In 2019, Davis became Professor of Quantum Physics at UCC, Senior Fellow of Wadham College, Oxford, and Professor of Physics at the University of Oxford.

== Research ==
Davis' overall interests focus upon macroscopic quantum physics. Active research subjects include studies of:

- Macroscopic Quantum Physics
- AI for Quantum Matter Discovery
- Quantum & Classical Spin Liquids
- Cu/Fe High-Tc Superconductors
- Atomic-scale Electronic Fluid Flow
- Electron Pair Density Wave States
- Topological Superconductors
- Kondo Metals & Insulators

For these studies, a variety of specialised instrumentation has been developed including scanning tunneling microscopes, quantum interferometers, quantum mechanical oscillators and spin noise spectrometers. The overall strategy is to exploit distinct capabilities and facilities so as to conduct scientifically harmonized studies with complementary scientific instruments at all group locations.

== Recognition ==
=== Memberships ===
Year	Organisation	Type	Ref.
2004	Institute of Physics	Fellow	
2005	American Physical Society	Fellow	
2010	National Academy of Sciences	Member	
2020	Royal Irish Academy	Member	
2022	American Association for the Advancement of Science	Fellow	

=== Awards ===
Year	Organisation	Award	Co-recipients	Citation	Ref.
2005	Duke University	Fritz London Memorial Prize	Sébastien Balibar and Richard Packard	"In recognition of his studies of superfluid ^{3}He weak link arrays revealing a rich variety of phenomena including quantum interference and for the invention and development of spectroscopic imaging STM techniques and their application in studies of individual impurity/dopant atom effects, vortex-core electronic structure, quasiparticle interference effects and alternative ordered states in the cuprate superconductors."	
2009	—	Kamerlingh Onnes Prize	Aharon Kapitulnik and John Tranquada	"For pioneering and seminal experiments which illuminate the nature of superconductivity in strongly correlated electron systems."	
2020	Aalto University	Olli V. Lounasmaa Memorial Prize	—	"For his pioneering investigations and applications of exquisite scanning probe techniques for visualization of electronic quantum matter at the atomic scale."	
2023	American Physical Society	Oliver E. Buckley Prize	Ali Yazdani	"For innovative applications of scanning tunneling microscopy and spectroscopy to complex quantum states of matter."	
2026	Institute of Physics	Michael Faraday Medal and Prize	—	"For the discovery and exploration of macroscopic quantum phenomena and states of matter."	

=== Honorary degrees ===
Year	University	Degree	Ref.
2013	National University of Ireland	Doctor of Science	
