= Quasiparticle interference imaging =

Electronic structure imaging method

Quasiparticle interference (QPI) imaging is a technique used in condensed matter physics that allows a scanning tunneling microscope to image the electronic structure of a material and infer information about the momentum space electronic structure from imaging the density of states in real space. In a scanning tunneling microscope, a very sharp metal tip is brought within a few angstrom of a sample. When a voltage is applied between the two and the tip is sufficiently close, a tunneling current $I(\mathbf{r},V)$ between the two can be measured and used, for example, to record atomically resolved images of the surface. Keeping the position of the tip constant and changing the bias voltage $V$ allows acquisition of tunneling spectra.

While scanning tunneling microscopy and spectroscopy of a perfect crystal would show the same tunneling spectrum at each point on the surface of the crystal due to translational invariance, if there is a defect, the density of states acquires a spatial dependence with modulated patterns that reflect the characteristic wavelength of the electrons in the material. These spatial modulations are effectively Friedel oscillations, except that Friedel oscillations describe the modulation in the charge density rather than the density of states.

Quasiparticle interference imaging has been applied to the study of a range of quantum materials and low-energy electronic structures. While angle-resolved photoemission spectroscopy (ARPES) is a more direct technique to study the electronic structure of a material, QPI differs from ARPES that its energy resolution is only limited by the temperature of the experiment. QPI measures both occupied and unoccupied states in the same measurement, and it can be measured in a magnetic field.

== History ==
Quasiparticle interference was first reported in two papers in 1993 by Mike Crommie and Yukio Hasegawa, showing standing wave patterns due to quantum interference in the surface states of Cu(111) and Au(111), respectively. The noble metal (111) surfaces exhibit surface states that are quasi-free two-dimensional electronic states living in a directional bulk band gap. Subsequently, these studies were extended to resonator structures constructed by atomic manipulation. The interference patterns were described by scattering theory. Subsequently, QPI was used by J. C. Séamus Davis and J.E. Hoffman to map out the structure of the superconducting gap in high-tc superconducting cuprates. Since then, QPI has been applied to many complex materials (often called "quantum materials"), from heavy fermion materials via high temperature superconductors and iron-based superconductors to graphene and topological insulators.

== Experimental techniques ==
Quasiparticle interference is measured by spatially mapping the local density of states. From the Bardeen theory of electron tunneling, it can be shown that the differential conductance as a function of bias voltage $V$ and position $\mathbf{r}$ recorded by scanning tunneling spectroscopy (for a derivation see there) is proportional to the density of states $\rho(\mathbf r,eV)$, i.e.

$g(\mathbf r,V)=\frac{\mathrm d I}{\mathrm d V}(\mathbf r,V)\sim\rho(\mathbf r,eV),$

where $I(\mathbf{r},V)$ is the tunneling current between tip and sample. This equation is valid if one assumes that the tip density of states is featureless and in the low temperature and low energy limit. The tunneling junction is symmetric, so the differential conductance $g(V,\mathbf r)$ is a convolution of the tip and sample density of states.

The differential conductance $g(\mathbf r,V)$ is typically measured using a lock-in technique, modulating the bias voltage $V$ by a small additional component $V_\mathrm{ac}=V_0\sin(\omega t)$ and detecting the response in the current at the same frequency $\omega$, or by numerical differentiation of the current as a function of voltage, $I(\mathbf r,V)$. To obtain a spatial map of the local density of states, either the differential conductance can be mapped in closed feedback loop conditions (using a lock-in amplifier operating at a frequency larger than the cut off frequency of the feedback loop), i.e. while a topographic image is recorded, or a set of tunneling spectra are acquired on an equally spaced grid, turning of the feedback loop at each point before the spectrum is recorded (sometimes also referred to as "current-imaging-tunneling spectroscopy" (CITS) map, see Scanning tunneling spectroscopy). Acquisition of these spectroscopic maps is typically slow, taking from a few hours to a few days. The QPI map is typically analysed from the Fourier transformation of $g(\mathbf r,V)$, i.e. $\tilde{g}(\mathbf q,V)={\cal F}(g(\mathbf r,V))$.

=== Sample preparation ===
A measurement of QPI requires an atomically clean and flat surface, which is typically prepared either through cleaving of a bulk crystal or by sputtering and annealing of the surface of a single crystal. Sputtering and annealing is the standard technique to clean the surfaces of noble metals in ultra-high vacuum, but because of preferential sputtering in compounds consisting of multiple elements is often unsuitable for complex materials. Sample cleavage typically works better in anisotropic materials that have a natural cleavage plane—for example, graphite or certain high temperature superconductors such as cuprates and many iron-based superconductors.

=== Setpoint effect ===
QPI maps $g(\mathbf r,V)$are not identical with the density of states at a constant height, $\rho(\mathbf{r},eV)$, because typically the tip-sample distance is adjusted at each point anew by the feedback loop. As a consequence, while for individual spectra typically the spectrum is proportional to the local density of states, $g(\mathbf r,V)=C(\mathbf{r})\rho(\mathbf{r},eV)$, the proportionality factor $C(\mathbf{r})$ depends on the position. This setpoint effect results in non-dispersive features in $\tilde{g}(\mathbf q,V)$ which can be misinterpreted as evidence for density wave orders.

== Modelling ==
=== Intuitive picture ===
An intuitive description of quasiparticle interference can be obtained by considering a quasiparticle being injected from the tip into the one-dimensional sample at position $x$ into a state $\Psi(x)=Ae^{ikx}+Be^{-ikx}$, i.e. which travels with wave vector $k$ from the position of the tip $x$ to the defect at the origin ($x=0$), and then back to the position of the tip with wave vector $-k$ ($A$ and $B$ are constants, $\Psi(x)$ the wave function of a quasiparticle state). The probability density (=density of states) associated with this state is $|\Psi(x)|^2=A^2+B^2+2AB\cos(2kx)$. The last term, $2AB\cos(2kx)$, is the quantum interference term which is the origin of quasi-particle interference. The wave vector $q=2k$ is the dominant scattering vector associated with the QPI, showing that here the wave length that would be detected in the density of states is half of that of the wave functions of the quasiparticles.

=== Joint density of states ===
The earliest descriptions of quasiparticle interference interpreted the signal solely on the joint density of states: large QPI signal at a given wave vector $\mathbf{q}$ is a consequence of a large joint density of states$A(\mathbf{k},E)\cdot A(\mathbf{k}-\mathbf{q},E)$, where $A(\mathbf{k},E)$ is the spectral function, $\mathbf{k}$ the momentum of a quasiparticle state, $E$ its energy and $\mathbf{q}$ a scattering vector. It neglects properties of the scatterer, the orbital and spin character of the bands involved and the tunneling matrix element. If the spectral function of a system $A(\mathbf{k},E)$ is known (e.g. from ARPES measurements, if the selection rules for optical transitions can be factored out or disregarded), the joint density of states can be straightforwardly obtained from the autocorrelation of the spectral function,

$\tilde{g}(\mathbf{q},V)=\int_\mathrm{BZ}A(\mathbf{k},eV)A(\mathbf{k}-\mathbf{q},eV)\mathrm d\mathbf{k},$

where the integral is over the Brillouin zone (BZ), $V$ the bias voltage, and $e$ the elementary charge of the electrons (hence $eV$ is the energy of the electrons). In this description, dominant signal comes either from scattering vectors $\mathbf{q}$ connecting points of high density of states, or parallel sections of the Fermi surface (see figure).

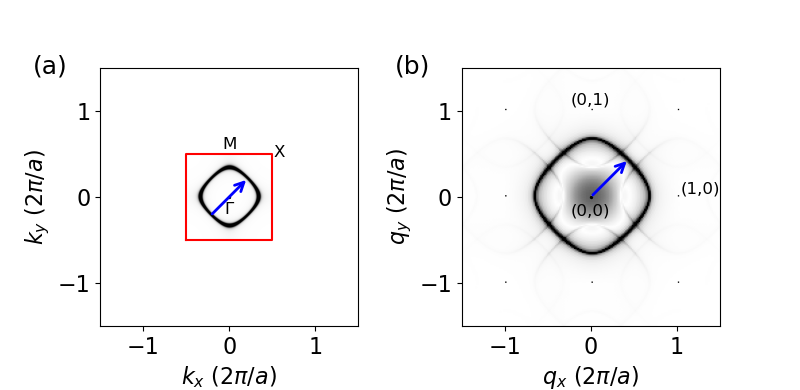
Spectral function A and quasi-particle interference B of a simple nearest neighbour tight-binding model, calculated using calcQPI. Blue arrows show a dominant scattering vector in B that corresponds to a nesting vector of the constant energy contour in A.

=== T-matrix formalism ===
A more rigorous description of quasiparticle interference is using scattering theory, where the propagation of quasiparticles in the unperturbed host is described by the Green's function $G_0$ of the unperturbed host

$G_0(\mathbf k,\omega)=\frac{1}{\omega-\epsilon_\mathbf k+i\eta},$

where $\epsilon_\mathbf k$ is the energy for a quasiparticle with momentum $\mathbf{k}$, $\omega$ the energy at which the Green's function is obtained and $\eta$ an infinitesimally small term to regularise the Green's function. The energies $\epsilon_\mathbf{k}$ are typically obtained from a tight-binding model.

The full Green's function of the host in presence of a defect, $G(\mathbf R,\mathbf R,\omega)$, can then be obtained from scattering theory. For simplicity we will here assume that there is a defect at the origin, i.e. at $\mathbf{R}_\mathrm d=(0,0)$, with potential $V=V_0\mathbb{1}$. The full Green's function is then obtained from the Green's function of the clean host using the Fourier transform of $G_0$ into real space by

$G(\mathbf R,\mathbf R,\omega)=G_0(\mathbf R,\mathbf R,\omega)+G_0(\mathbf R,0,\omega)VG(0,\mathbf{R},\omega).$

This is a recursive expression (since $G(\mathbf R,\mathbf R^\prime,\omega)$ appears on the right and left hand side of the equation) resulting in an infinite series. Using the geometric series to write $T=\frac{V}{\mathbb{1}-V\sum_\mathbf{k} G_0(\mathbf{k},\omega)}$, one arrives at

$G(\mathbf R,\mathbf R,\omega)=G_0(\mathbf R,\mathbf R,\omega)+G_0(\mathbf R,0,\omega)T(\omega)G_0(0,\mathbf{R},\omega).$

From this expression, the local density of states at lattice site $\mathbf{R}$ can be readily calculated using

$\rho(\mathbf{R},\omega)=-\frac{1}{\pi}\mathrm{Im}(\mathrm{Tr}(G(\mathbf R,\mathbf R,\omega))$.

=== Continuum QPI calculations ===
The T-matrix formalism described in the previous section has two major shortcomings: A it only results in one value for the local density of states per unit cell since $\rho(\mathbf{R},\omega)$ is only defined for lattice vectors $\mathbf{R}$, and B the overlap of the wave functions in the sample with the tip wave function is not accounted for. These limitations of the lattice Green's function calculation can be addressed using the continuum Green's function, where a basis transformation of the lattice Green's function $G(\mathbf R,\mathbf R,\omega)$ from the orbital basis into a continuum real-space basis is performed using

$G(\mathbf{r},\mathbf{r},\omega)=\sum_{\mathbf{R},\mathbf{R}^\prime, \mu, \nu}G^{\mu\nu}_{\mathbf{R},\mathbf{R}^\prime}w_{\mathbf{R}\mu}(\mathbf{r})w_{\mathbf{R}^\prime\nu}(\mathbf{r}^\prime).$

Here, $\mathbf{r}$ is now a continuous vector in real space, $\mu$, $\nu$ are the orbital indices and $w_{\mathbf{R}\mu}(\mathbf{r})$ are the Wannier functions which describe the overlap of the wave functions with the tip. From the continuum Green's function $G(\mathbf{r},\mathbf{r},\omega)$ the continuum local density of states

$\rho(\mathbf{r},\omega)=-\frac{1}{\pi}\mathrm{Im}G(\mathbf{r},\mathbf{r},\omega)$

can be calculated, now as a function of a continuous position in real space $\mathbf{r}$. There exist open-source software packages like CalcQPI that can do these calculations.

=== Density functional theory ===
Quasiparticle interference can also be obtained fully from density functional theory calculations, where the defect is introduced into the calculation and then the full scattering pattern is calculated.

== Applications ==
=== Graphene ===
The Dirac cone in the electronic structure of graphene results in a suppression of backscattering which results in peculiar half-moon-shaped scattering patterns around the atomic peaks. This demonstrates that QPI also contains information about the Berry phase (and hence the quantum geometric tensor) of the electronic states. The suppression of backscattering is similarly observed in topological insulators, where the suppression is due to spin-selection rules.

=== High-temperature superconductors ===
QPI has been applied in cuprate high-temperature superconductors. They exhibit quasi-two dimensional electronic structures, and due to their layered crystal structure typically a well-defined cleavage plane. In particular on the surface of single crystal Bi_{2}Sr_{2}CaCu_{2}O_{8+δ}, quasi-particle interference was imaged and interpreted in terms of Bogoliubov quasiparticles, i.e. quasiparticles modified by the presence of the superconducting pairing. Measuring the interference of these Bogoliubov quasiparticles has enabled mapping out the superconducting gap of Bi_{2}Sr_{2}CaCu_{2}O_{8+δ} with an energy resolution of about $1\mathrm{meV}$ and showing a behaviour consistent with a $d$-wave gap. The quasiparticle interference patterns in this case are captured by the so-called 'octet model', which describes the dominant scattering vectors as connecting eight spots of high density of states in the Brillouin zone. Furthermore, due to the different coherence factors that enter into the scattering phase for Bogoliubov quasiparticles, a measurement of the phase of these reveals information about the sign structure of the order parameter, confirming the $d$-wave symmetry in the case of the cuprates. The cuprate superconductors were among the first materials to which the continuum Green's function calculations has been applied. It has been used to describe defect bound states and the quasiparticle interference of these materials.

=== Iron-based superconductors ===
The iron-based superconductors, i.e. iron pnictides and chalcogenides, have typically natural cleavage planes making them suitable samples for STM measurements. Quasi-particle interference has confirmed the $s^{\pm}$-wave symmetry of the superconducting gap for the case of FeSe_{0.4}Te_{0.6}, and the anisotropy of the superconducting gap in LiFeAs.

=== Heavy fermion materials ===
The first heavy fermion material to which QPI was applied is URu_{2}Si_{2}, where the formation of a heavy band due to a hybridization gap was observers.

In subsequent studies of the heavy-fermion superconductor CeCoIn_{5}, also information about the symmetry of the superconducting order parameter was obtained, however without a full mapping of the momentum-space structure of the superconducting gap as was achieved in the cuprate and iron-based superconductors.

Because QPI only images a two-dimensional projection of the electronic structure and due to the three-dimensionality of the electronic structure of these materials, features in QPI remain typically comparatively broad.

=== Strontium ruthenates ===
The strontium ruthenates adopt a perovskite crystal structure and form a Ruddlesden-Popper series of compounds with composition Sr_{n+1}Ru_{n}O_{3n+1}. The crystal structure is closely related to that of the cuprate high-temperature superconductors. For this reason, the discovery of superconductivity in the n=1 member Sr_{2}RuO_{4} generated significant interest due to the hope that understanding superconductivity in this material might also uncover the origin of high-temperature superconductivity. Shortly after, it was suggested that it is also a triplet superconductor, a claim refuted more recently. The material exhibits a well-defined cleavage plane and surfaces. In the normal state, QPI shows an electronic dispersion consistent with what is seen in ARPES, with strong signatures of electron correlations. The clean surface exhibits a surface reconstruction that appears to suppress superconductivity, with only one report suggesting that a superconducting gap can be detected on a clean surface. The photoemission and QPI data obtained from surfaces of Sr_{2}RuO_{4} has allowed for a detailed comparison of the electronic structure between the two techniques and with electronic structure calculations, with an agreement between the experimental techniques within a few meV, providing a validation of modelling of QPI. The low energy electronic structure is found to exhibit multiple Van Hove singularities in the vicinity of the Fermi energy.

== See also ==
Methods:

- Scanning tunneling microscope
- Scanning tunneling spectroscopy
- Angle-resolved photoemission spectroscopy

Materials:

- Graphene
- topological insulators
- High-temperature superconductors
- Iron-based superconductor
- Heavy fermion material
