= Multi-tip scanning tunneling microscopy =

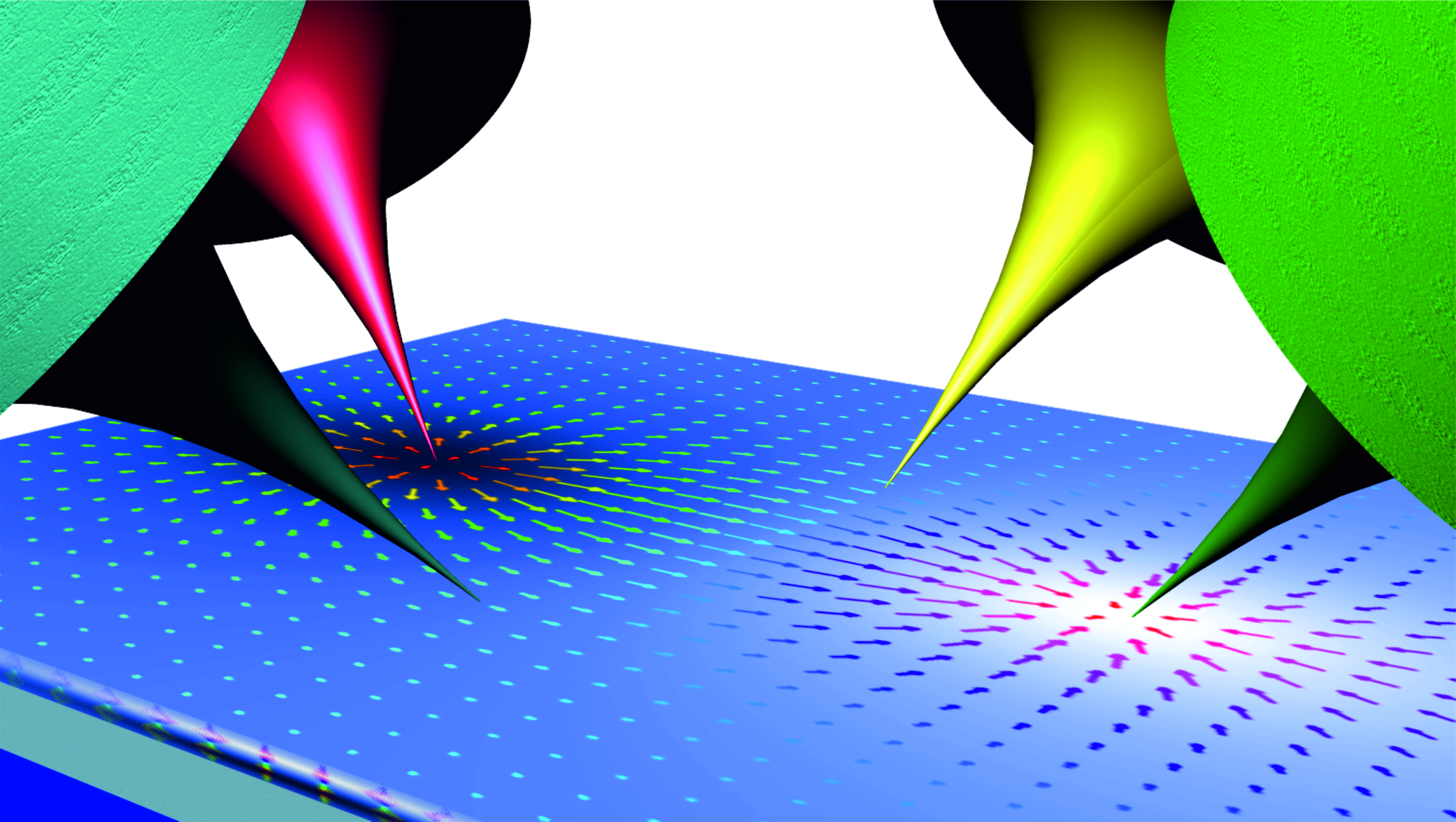
A schematic image of a multi-tip STM measurement with the red and the green tip injecting and draining a lateral current into the sample under study. The yellow and the left green tip measure the voltages at their respective positions which builds up due to the injected current.

Multi-tip scanning tunneling microscopy (Multi-tip STM) extends scanning tunneling microscopy (STM) from imaging to dedicated electrical measurements at the nanoscale like a ″multimeter at the nanoscale″. In materials science, nanoscience, and nanotechnology, it is desirable to measure electrical properties at a particular position of the sample. For this purpose, multi-tip STMs in which several tips are operated independently have been developed. Apart from imaging the sample, the tips of a multi-tip STM are used to form contacts to the sample at desired locations and to perform local electrical measurements.

== Introduction ==
As microelectronics evolves into nanoelectronics, it is essential to perform electronic transport measurements at nanoscale. The standard approach is to use lithographic methods to contact nanostructures, as it is also used in the final nanoelectronic device. In research and development stages, however, other methods to contact nanoelectronic devices or generally nanostructures may be more suitable. An alternative approach for contacting nanostructures uses the tips of a multi-tip scanning tunneling microscope—in analogy to the test leads of a multimeter used at macroscale. The advantages of this approach are: (a) in situ contacting of ″as grown″ nanostructures still under vacuum helps keep delicate nanostructures free from contamination induced by lithography steps performed for contacting. (b) Flexible positioning of the contacting tips and different contact configurations are easy to realize, while lithographic contacts are fixed. (c) Probing with sharp tips can be non-invasive (high ohmic), while lithographic contacts are typically invasive (low ohmic). To use a scanning tunneling microscope (STM) for electrical transport measurements at nanostructures or at surfaces, more than one tip is required. This motivates the use of multi-tip scanning tunneling microscopes which give access to the above outlined advantages in nanoprobing. Several review articles about multi-tip STM can be found in the further reading section below.

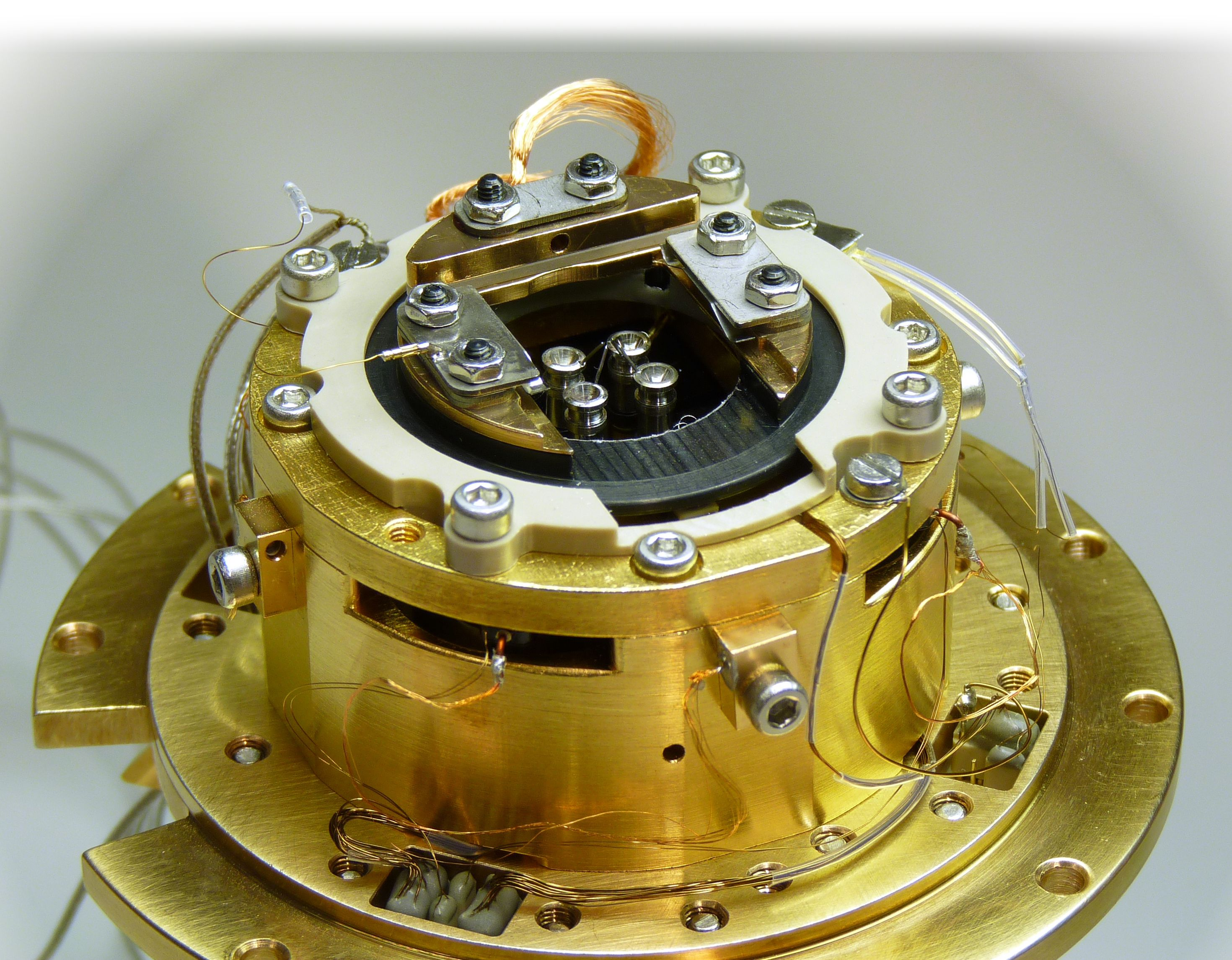
Four-tip STM with the four tips pointing up in the center. The diameter of the instrument is 50 mm.

== Principle of operation ==
Multi-tip scanning tunneling microscopes consist usually of four STM units positioning each of the tips individually to the desired position on the sample. To reduce thermal drift of the tips, the four STM units, should be as small and compact as possible. It is important that the motion of the tips can be observed, either by an optical microscope, or by a scanning electron microscope (SEM). This allows to bring the tips close together and to position them at the desired measurement locations. The tips in a multi tip STM are usually mounted under 45° relative to the vertical direction to facilitate positioning all tips at one region on the sample.

After the first multi-tip STM was introduced, several home-built instruments were designed and today, several commercial instruments are available as well.

An extension of the multi-tip STM technique is the upgrade to atomic force microscopy (AFM) operation. For applications in nanoelectronics, most of the samples consist of conducting "target" areas at the surface, separated by non-conducting areas. To guide the tip to the conducting areas, AFM imaging instead of or in addition to optical microscope or SEM guided positioning of the tips, can be very useful.

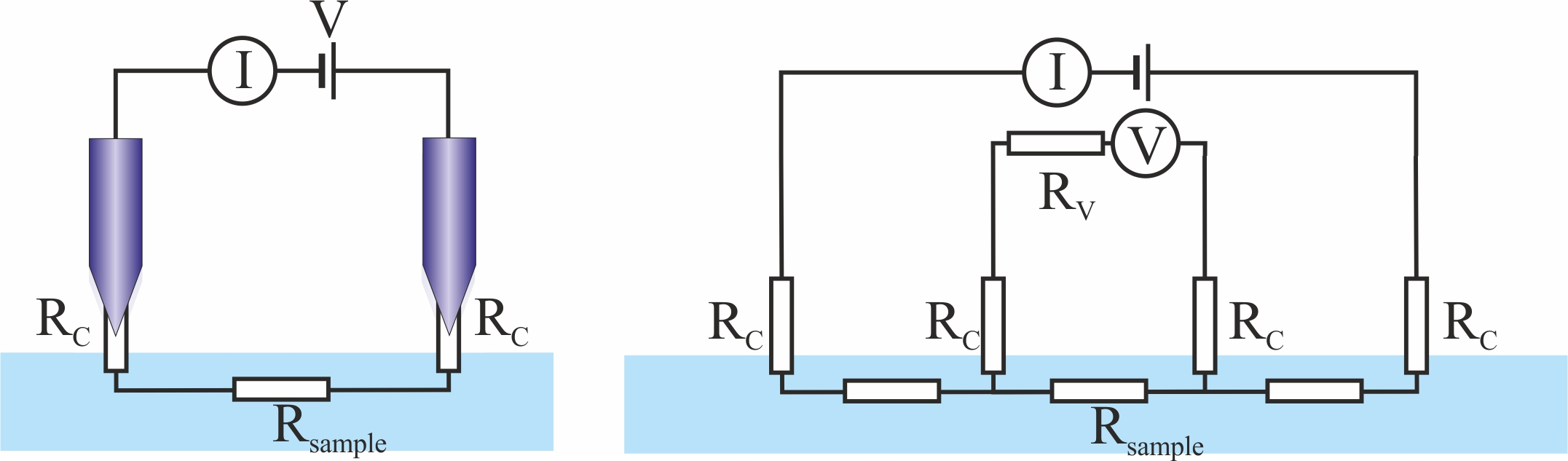
In a two-point measurement the sum of the sample resistance and the resistance of the contacts is measured. In a four-point measurement the sample resistance is measured without the influence of the contact resistance.

When performing electrical measurements on the nanoscale, it should be stressed that the contact resistance is often very large at the STM tip contact to the sample because the contact area is very small, so that four-point measurements are indispensable in resistance measurements with a muti-tip STM. This is even more important in measuring nano-scale objects, because the contacts to these objects are inevitably nano-scale. In a two-point resistance measurement, the two current injecting tips are used for voltage probing as well. Therefore, the measured resistance R = V/I also includes the contribution from the two contact resistances R_{C}. In a four-point measurement the current injecting circuit is separated from the voltage sensing circuit. If the voltage measurement is performed with a large internal resistance R_{V}, the influence of the contact resistances can be neglected. This is the main advantage of the four-point measurement.

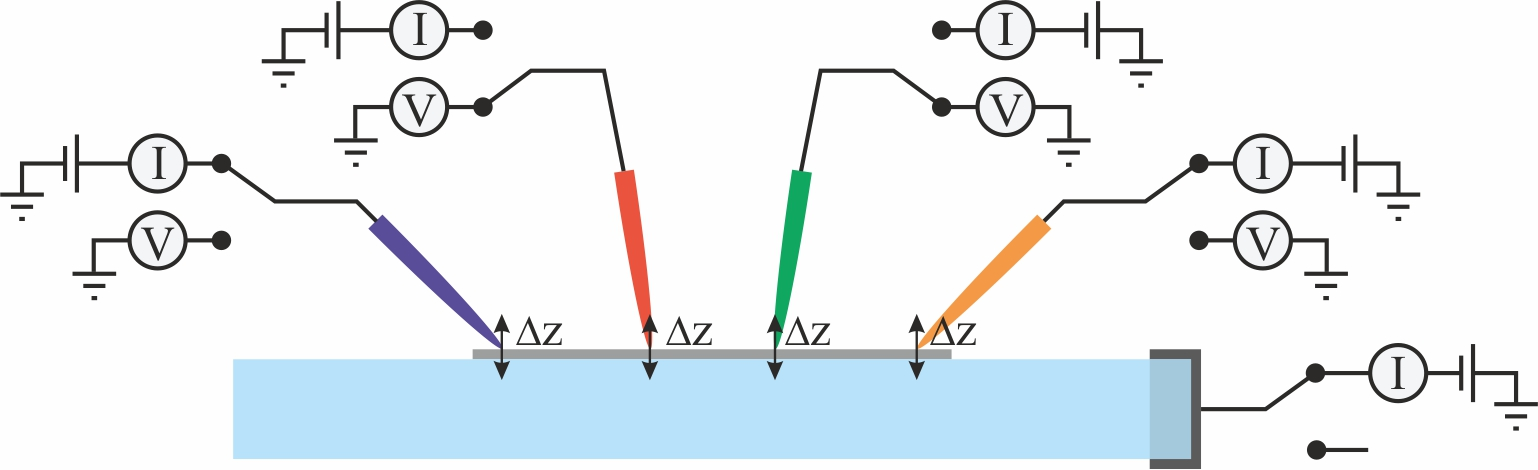
Schematic of electrical measurements performed with a multi-tip STM. Each tip can be configured as current probe or as voltage probe. The simplest example of an electrical measurement is a classical four-point resistance measurement.

Performing electrical measurements with a multi-tip STM demands more than four tips and the ability to position them as required. Concerted measurements of currents and voltages with all four tips must be performed. The electronics allows operating each tip either as (biased) current probe, or as voltage probe. Different I-V ramps are applied between different tips (and/or the sample). In the simplest case a current is injected between the two outer tips and a potential difference is measured between the inner tips (classical four-point measurement), also as a function of temperature. However, also various kinds of other measurements can be performed, e.g., a tip or the sample can be used as gate electrode.

== Applications of multi-tip STM ==
=== Graphene nanoribbons and graphene nanostructures ===
The local transport properties of 40 nm wide graphene nanoribbons grown on silicon carbide (SiC) substrates, are studied by means of a multi-tip STM. The graphene nanoribbons exhibit exceptional transport properties, such as ballistic conduction even at room temperature with mean free paths up to several μm. Such epitaxial graphene nanoribbons are important not only in fundamental science, but also because they can be readily produced in thousands in advanced nanoelectronics, which can make use of their room-temperature ballistic transport properties.

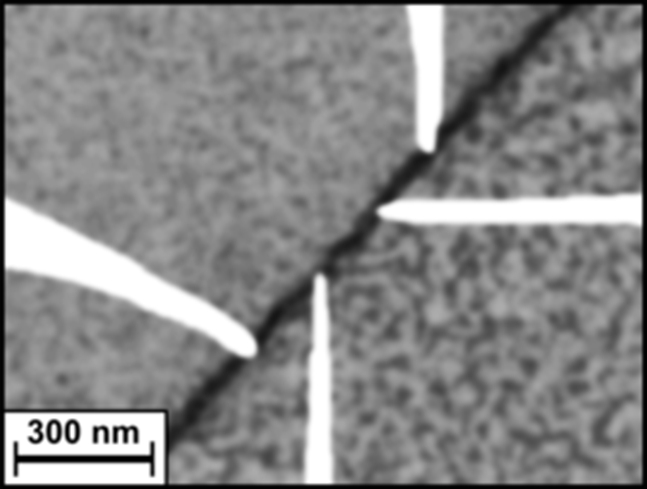
SEM image of four probes contacting a graphene nanoribbon

=== Resistance profiling along freestanding GaAs nanowires ===
The multi-tip STM can be used for resistance mapping along freestanding GaAs nanowires with a diameter of about 100 nm. The nanowires are still "as grown" upright and attached to the substrate, thus it is not possible to contact nanowires by lithographic techniques. In the measurement configuration shown in the figure, the sample is tilted by 45° to facilitate optimal SEM imaging of the nanowires. Three tips brought into contact with a nanowire realize a four-point resistance measurement (with the sample as fourth contact). Tip 1 injects the current to the nanowire with the sample acting as current drain, while tip 2 and tip 3 act as voltage probes. While it is relatively easy to study the structure of these nanowires e.g., with high resolution electron microscopy, it is difficult to access the electrical properties determined by the doping profile along the nanowire. From the measuremed four-point resistance along the nanowire a doping profile along the nanowire can be obtained.

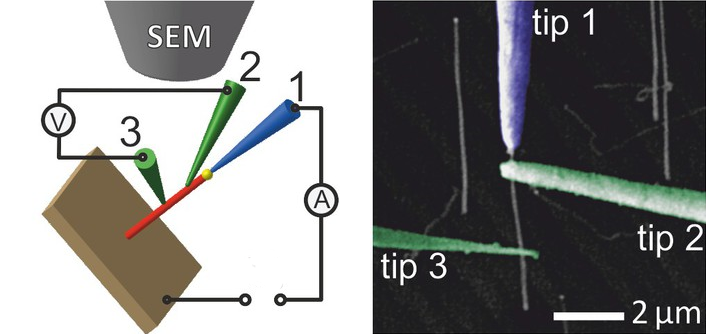
Left: Schematic of a four-point measurement on a nanowire with three tips contacting the nanowire. Right: SEM image of a freestanding nanowire contacted by three tips. The STM tips act like the test leads of a multimeter, however, contacting objects like the nanowire at the nanoscale.

Movie of an STM tip moving along a GaAs nanowire measuring a four-point probe resistance profile at many points along the nanowire.

=== Multi-tip potentiometry ===
A method giving valuable insight into the charge transport properties of nanostructures is the scanning tunneling potentiometry (STP). STP can be performed with a multi-tip STM and allows to map the potential landscape while a current flows through the film, nanostructure, or surface under study. Potentiometry maps give insight into fundamental transport properties, such as the influence of defects on the local electric transport. The implementation is shown in the figure, with the outer tips injecting a current into the nanostructure or surface being studied, while then center tip simultaneously measures the topography and also records the electric potential at each image point which is induced by the flowing current. This way a potential map measured e.g. on a silicon surface can be acquired with a potential resolution is a couple of μV. The potential map in the figure shows that the largest potential drop occurs at the atomic step edges. From these data the resistance of a single atomic step, or a domain boundary can be obtained. Moreover, if a current flows around a nanoscale defect like. e.g.. a void, the potential map developing due to the flowing current can be measured.

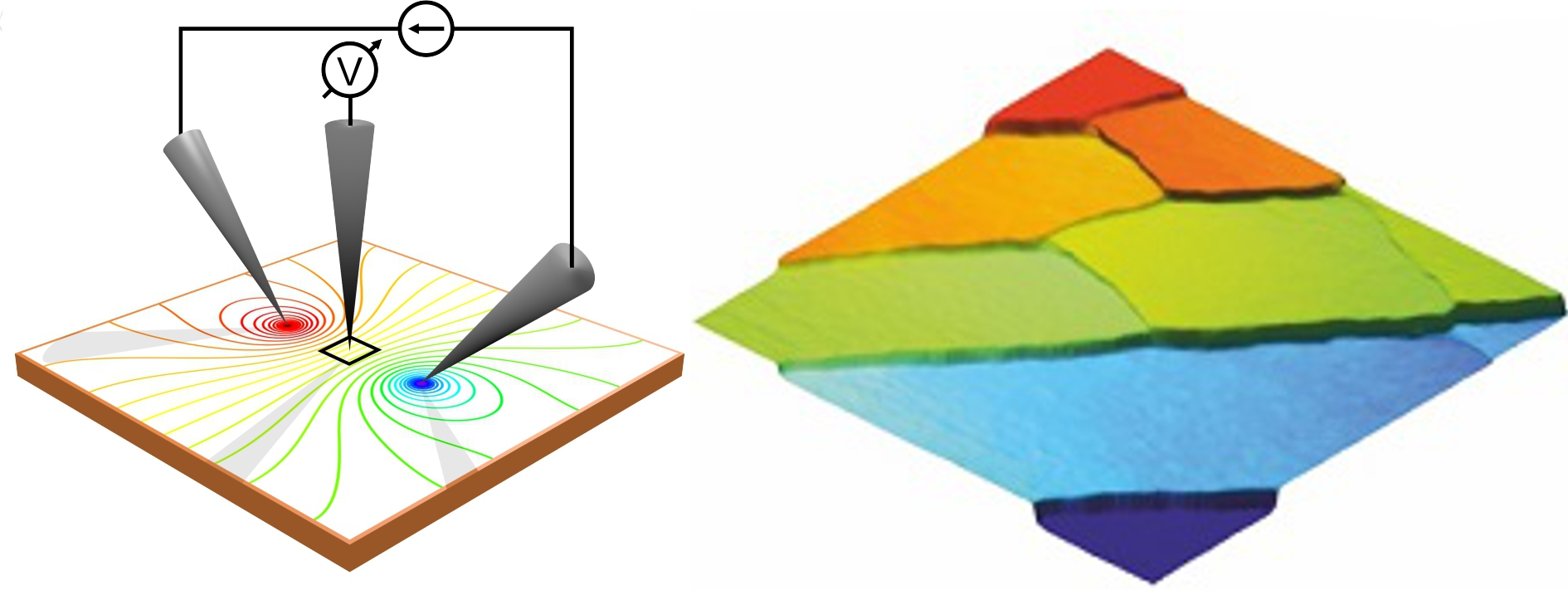
Left: Schematic of the scanning tunneling potentiometry setup implemented into the multi-tip scanning tunneling microscope. Two tips inject a current in the sample surface with the third tip mapping the resulting potential distribution. The scan area is indicated as a black square. Right: Potential map measured on a Si surface with the main potential drop occurring at the atomic step edges. The current flows from the top to the bottom in this image.

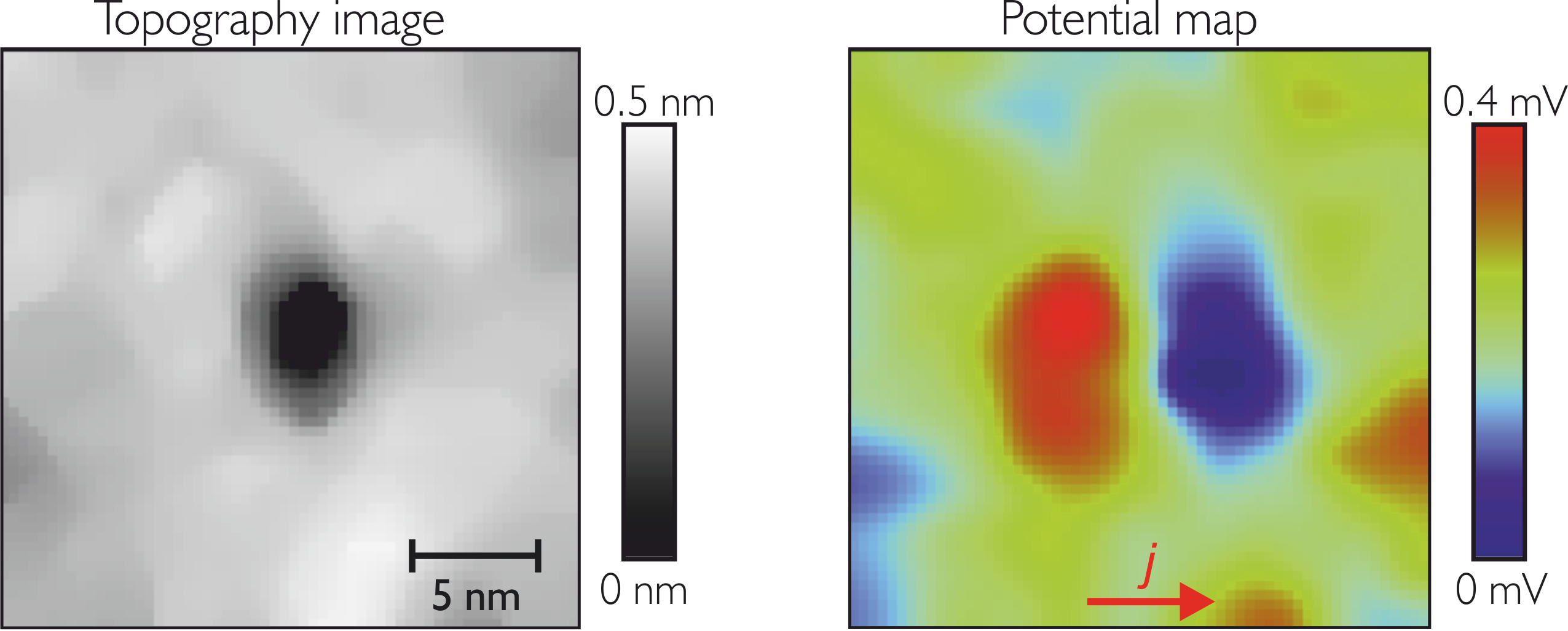
Left: STM topography image of a 5 nm large void in a topological insulator film. Right: Potential dipole developing around the nanscale void due to the current flowing.

=== Disentangling surface conductivity from bulk conductivity ===
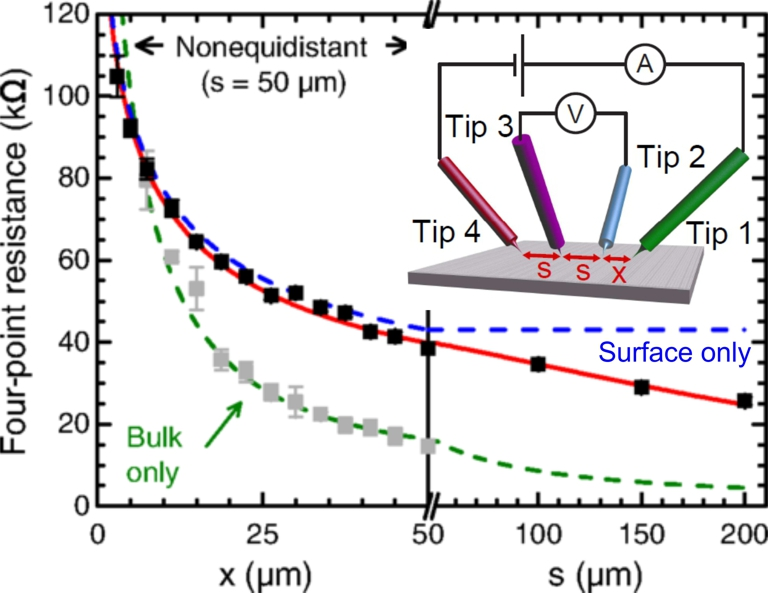
Distance dependent measurement of the four-point resistance on a Si(111)-7×7 sample allows to disentangle the surface conductivity from the bulk conductivity.

As nano-devices become smaller and smaller, the surface to volume ratio (i.e., the fraction of atoms located at the surface) increases constantly. The increasing importance of surface conductance compared to conductance through the bulk in modern nanoelectronic devices calls for a reliable determination of the surface conductivity to minimize the influence of undesired leakage currents on the device performance or to use surfaces as functional units. A model system for corresponding investigations is the Si(111)-7×7 surface. The challenge is to disentangle the contribution due to the surface conductivity from the bulk conductivity. Using multi-tip STM, researchers developed a method that uses distance dependent four-probe measurements in the linear configuration to determine surface conductivity.

=== Spin current in quantum materials ===
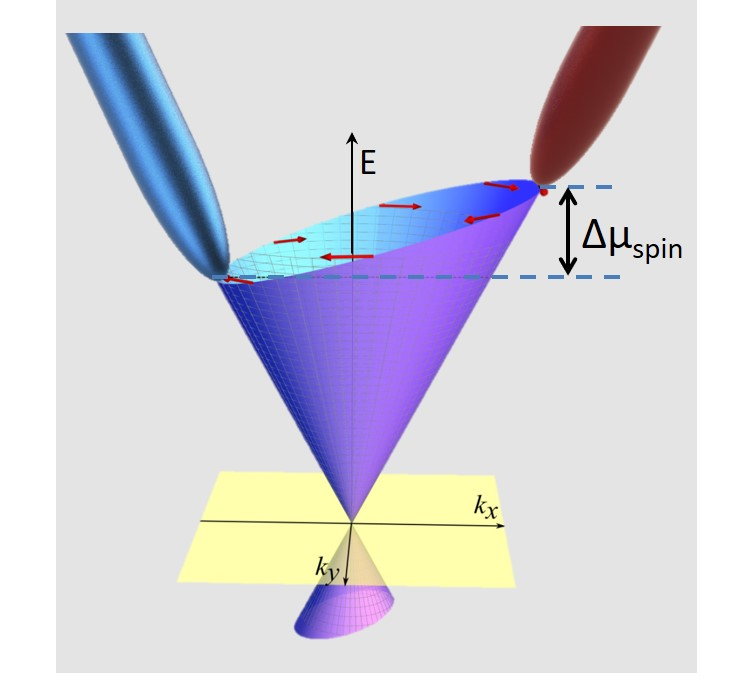
The spin voltage is generated by the electron's spin current. (Credit: Saban Hus and An-Ping Li/Oak Ridge National Laboratory, U.S. Dept. of Energy).

Multi-tip STM is used as a method for the detection of the spin-voltage in topological insulators using spin-polarized four-probe scanning tunneling microscopy on Bi_{2}Te_{2}Se surfaces. The spin-dependent electrochemical potential is separated from the ohmic contribution. This component is identified as the spin-chemical potential arising from the 2D charge current through the spin momentum locked topological surface states (TSS). The new method uses a magnetic tip to observe the spin behavior of electrons on the material's surface.

== See also ==
- Scanning tunneling microscopy
- Atomic force microscopy
- Four-terminal sensing
- Nanoprobing
- Scanning electron microscope
