= Trans America Run =

The Trans America Run (USA), also known as the TransAm, is the approximately 3000-mile coast-to-coast foot race across the United States. TransAm has historically been run from California to New York, starting at San Francisco City Hall and ending at New York City Hall, though some runners have completed a variation starting in Los Angeles. The world record for the TransAm was set in October 2016 by Pete Kostelnick who finished in 42 days, 6 hours, and 30 minutes.

== Record holders ==
San Francisco, California to New York City, New York
Year	Champion (m)	Nationality	Time	Year	Champion (f)	Nationality	Time
2026	Cameron Dean Balser		41d 16h 46m				
2016	Pete Kostelnick	American	42d 6h 30m	2023	Jenny Hoffman	American	47d 12h 36m
1980	Frank Giannino Jr.	--	46d 8h 36m	2017	Sandra Villines	--	54d 16h 24m

Los Angeles, California to New York City, New York
Year	Champion (m)	Nationality	Time	Year	Champion (f)	Nationality	Time
2023	Paul Johnson	American	51d 2h 54m	1978	Mavis Hutchinson	South African	69d 2h 40m

== See also ==
- Trans-American Footrace
