= Photon scanning microscopy =

Type of microscopic technique used for imaging surfaces by tunneling of photons

The operation of a photon scanning tunneling microscope (PSTM) is analogous to the operation of an electron scanning tunneling microscope, with the primary distinction being that PSTM involves tunneling of photons instead of electrons from the sample surface to the probe tip. A beam of light is focused on a prism at an angle greater than the critical angle of the refractive medium in order to induce total internal reflection within the prism. Although the beam of light is not propagated through the surface of the refractive prism under total internal reflection, an evanescent field of light is still present at the surface.

The evanescent field is a standing wave which propagates along the surface of the medium and decays exponentially with increasing distance from the surface. The surface wave is modified by the topography of the sample, which is placed on the surface of the prism. By placing a sharpened, optically conducting probe tip very close to the surface (at a distance <λ), photons are able to propagate through the space between the surface and the probe (a space which they would otherwise be unable to occupy) through tunneling, allowing detection of variations in the evanescent field and thus, variations in surface topography of the sample. In this manner, PSTM is able to map the surface topography of a sample in much the same way as in electron scanning tunneling microscope.

One major advantage of PSTM is that an electrically conductive surface is no longer necessary. This makes imaging of biological samples much simpler and eliminates the need to coat samples in gold or another conductive metal. Furthermore, PSTM can be used to measure the optical properties of a sample and can be coupled with techniques such as photoluminescence, absorption, and Raman spectroscopy.

== History ==
Conventional optical microscopy utilizing far-field illumination achieves resolution that is restricted by the Abbe diffraction limit. Modern optical microscopes with diffraction limited resolution are therefore capable of resolving features as small as λ/2.3. Researchers have long sought to break the diffraction limit of conventional optical microscopy in order to achieve super-resolution microscopes. One of the first major advances toward this goal was the development of scanning optical microscopy (SOM) by Young and Roberts in 1951. SOM involves scanning individual regions of the sample with a very small field of light illuminated through a diffraction limited aperture. Individual features as small as λ/3 are observed at each scanned point, and the image collected at each point is then compiled together into one image of the sample.

The resolution of these devices was extended beyond the diffraction limit in 1972 by Ash and Nicholls, who first demonstrated the concept of near-field scanning optical microscopy. In NSOM, the object is illuminated through a sub-wavelength sized aperture located at a distance <λ from the sample surface. The concept was first demonstrated using microwaves, however the technique was extended into the field of optical imaging in 1984 by Pohl, Denk, and Lanz, who developed a near-field scanning optical microscope capable of achieving a resolution of λ/20. Along with the development of electron scanning tunneling microscopy in 1982 by Binning et al., this led to the development of the photon scanning tunneling microscope by Reddick and Courjon (independently) in 1989. PSTM combines the techniques of STM and NSOM by creating an evanescent field using total internal reflection in a prism under the sample and detecting sample-induced variations in the evanescent field by tunneling photons into a sharpened optical fiber probe.

== Theory ==
=== Total internal reflection ===
A beam of light travelling through a medium of refractive index n_{1} incident on an interface with a second medium of refractive index n_{2} (with n_{1}>n_{2}) will be partially transmitted through the second medium and partially reflected back through the first medium if the angle of incidence is less than the critical angle. At the critical angle, the incident beam will be refracted tangent to the interface (i.e. it will travel along the boundary between the two media). At an angle greater than the critical angle (when the incident beam is nearly parallel to the interface) the light will be completely reflected within the first medium, a condition known as total internal reflection. In the case of PSTM, the first medium is a prism, typically made of glass, and the second medium is the air above the prism.

=== Evanescent field coupling ===
Under total internal reflection, although no energy is propagated through the second medium, a non-zero electric field is still present in the second medium near the interface. This field exponentially decays with increasing distance from the interface and is known as the evanescent field. Figure 1 shows the optical component of the evanescent field is modulated by the presence of a dielectric sample placed on the interface (the surface of the prism), hence the field contains detailed optical information about the sample surface. Although this image is lost in the diffraction limited far field, a detailed optical image may be constructed by probing the near field region (at a distance <λ) and detecting sample induced modulation of the evanescent field.

This is accomplished through frustrated total internal reflection, also known as evanescent field coupling. This occurs when a third medium (in this case the sharpened fiber probe) of refractive index n_{3} (with n_{3}>n_{2}) is brought near the interface at a distance <λ. At this distance the third medium overlaps the evanescent field, disrupting the total reflection of light in the first medium and allowing propagation of the wave in the third medium. This process is analogous to quantum tunneling; the photons confined within the first medium are able to tunnel through the second medium (where they cannot exist) into the third medium. In PSTM, the tunneled photons are conducted through the fiber probe into a detector where a detailed image of the evanescent field can then be reconstructed. The degree of coupling between the probe and surface is highly distance dependent, as the evanescent field is an exponentially decaying function of distance from the interface. Hence, the degree of coupling is used to measure the tip to surface distance in order to obtain topographical information about the sample placed on the surface.

=== Probe-field interaction ===
The intensity of the evanescent field at a distance z from the surface is given by the relation

I~exp(-γz)

where γ is the decay constant of the field and is represented by

γ = 2k_{2}(n_{12}^{2}sin^{2}θ_{i} − 1)^{1/2}

where n_{12}=(n_{1}/n_{2}), n_{1} is the refractive index of the first medium, n_{2} is the refractive index of the second medium, k is the magnitude of the incident wave vector, and θ_{i} is the angle of incidence. The decay constant is used in determining the transmittance of photons from the surface to the probe tip, however the degree of coupling is also highly dependent on the properties of the probe tip such as the length of the probe tip region in contact with the evanescent field, the probe tip geometry, and the size of the aperture (in apertured probes). The degree of optical coupling to the probe tip as a function of height must therefore be determined individually for a given instrument and probe tip. In practice, this is usually determined during instrument calibration by scanning the probe perpendicular to the surface and monitoring the detector signal as a function of tip height. Thus the decay constant is found empirically and is used to interpret the signal obtained during the lateral scan and to set a feedback point for the piezoelectric transducer during constant signal scanning.

Although the decay constant is typically determined through empirical methods, detailed mathematical models of probe–sample coupling interactions that account for probe tip geometry and sample distance have been published by Goumri-Said et al. In many cases the evanescent field is primarily modulated by sample surface topography, hence the detected optical signal can be interpreted as the topography of the sample. However, the refractive index and absorption properties of the sample can cause further changes to the detected evanescent field, making it necessary to separate optical data from topographical data. This is often accomplished by coupling PSTM to other techniques such as AFM (see below). Theoretical models have also been developed by Reddick to account for modulation of the evanescent field by secondary effects such as scattering and absorbance at the sample surface.

== Procedure ==
Figure 2 shows the operation and principle of PSTM. An evanescent field is attained using a laser beam at an attenuated total reflection geometry for total internal reflection within a triangular prism. The sample is placed on a glass or quartz slide, which is affixed to the prism with an index matching gel. The sample then becomes the surface at which total internal reflection occurs. The probe consists of the sharpened tip of an optical fiber attached to a piezoelectric transducer to control fine motion of the probe tip during scanning. The end of the optical fiber is coupled to a photomultiplier tube, which acts as the detector. The probe tip and piezoelectric transducer are housed within a scanner cartridge mounted above the sample. The position of this assembly is manually adjusted to bring the probe tip within tunneling distance of the evanescent field.

As photons tunnel from the evanescent field into the probe tip, they are conducted along the optical fiber to the photomultiplier tube, where they are converted into an electrical signal. The amplitude of the electrical output of the photomultiplier tube is directly proportional to the number of photons collected by the probe, thus allowing measurement of the degree of interaction of the probe with the evanescent field at the sample surface. Since this field exponentially decays with increasing distance from the surface, the degree of intensity of the field corresponds to the height of the probe from the sample surface. The electrical signals are sent to a computer where the topography of the surface is mapped based on the corresponding changes in the detected evanescent field intensity.

The electrical output from the photomultiplier tube is used as constant feedback to the piezoelectric transducer to adjust the height of the tip according to variations in surface topography. The probe must be scanned perpendicular to the sample surface in order to calibrate the instrument and determine the decay constant of the field intensity as a function of probe height. During this scan, a feedback point is set so that the piezoelectric transducer can maintain constant signal intensity during the lateral scan.

=== Fiber probe tips ===
The resolution of a PSTM instrument is highly dependent on probe tip geometry and diameter. Probes are typically fabricated via chemical etching of an optical fiber in a solution of HF and can be apertured or apertureless. Using chemical etching, fiber tips with a curvature radius as low as 20 nm have been made. In apertured tips, the sides of the sharpened fiber are sputter coated in a metal or other material. This helps to limit tunneling of photons into the side of the probe in order to maintain more consistent and accurate evanescent field coupling. Due to the rigidity of the fiber probe, even brief contact with the surface will destroy the probe tip.

Larger probe tips have a greater degree of coupling to the evanescent field and will therefore have greater collection efficiency due to a larger area of the optical fiber interacting with the field. The primary limitation of a large tip is the increased probability of collision with rougher surface features as well as photon tunneling into the side of the probe. A narrower probe tip is necessary to resolve more abrupt surface features without collision, however the collection efficiency will be reduced.

Figure 3 shows that fiber probe with metal coating. In metal coated fiber probes, the diameter and geometry of the aperture, or uncoated area at the tip of the probe, determines the collection efficiency. Wider cone angles result in larger aperture diameters and shorter probe lengths, while narrower cone angles result in smaller aperture diameters and longer probes. Double tapered probe tips have been developed in which a long, narrow region of the probe tapers into a tip with a wider cone angle. This provides a wider aperture for greater collection efficiency while still maintaining a long narrow probe tip capable of resolving abrupt surface features with low risk of collision.

== PSTM coupled spectroscopy techniques ==
=== Photoluminescence ===
It has been demonstrated that photoluminescence spectra can be recorded utilizing a modified PSTM instrument. Coupling photoluminescence spectroscopy to PSTM allows the observation of emission from local nanoscopic regions of a sample and provides an understanding of how the photoluminescent properties of a material change due to surface morphology or chemical differences in an inhomogeneous sample. In this experiment, a 442 nm He-Cd laser beam under total internal reflection was used as an excitation source. The signal from the optical fiber was first passed through a monochromator before reaching a photomultiplier tube to record the signal. Photoluminescence spectra were recorded from local regions of a ruby crystal sample. A subsequent publication successfully demonstrated the use of PSTM to record the fluorescence spectrum of a Cr^{3+} ion implanted sapphire cryogenically cooled under liquid nitrogen. This technique allows characterization of individual surface features of semiconductor samples whose photoluminescent properties are highly temperature dependent and must be studied at cryogenic temperatures.

=== Infrared ===
PSTM has been modified to record spectra in the infrared range. Utilizing both cascade arc and free electron laser CLIO as infrared light sources, infrared absorbance spectra were recorded from a diazoquinone resin. This mode of operation requires a fluoride glass fiber and HgCdTe detector in order to effectively collect and record the infrared wavelengths used. Furthermore, the fiber tip must be metal coated and oscillated during collection in order to sufficiently reduce background noise. The surface must first be imaged using a wavelength that will not be absorbed by the sample. Next, the light source is stepped through the infrared wavelengths of interest at each point during collection. The spectrum is acquired by analysis of the differences in the images recorded at different wavelengths.

=== Atomic force microscopy ===
Figure 4 shows the combination of a PSTM, AFM, and conventional microscope. In PSTM and AFM the silicon nitride cantilever can be used as the optical probe tip in order to simultaneously perform (AFM) and PSTM. This allows comparison of the recorded optical signal with the higher resolution topography data obtained by AFM. Silicon nitride is a suitable material for an optical probe tip as it is optically transparent down to 300 nm. However, since it is not optically conducting, the photons collected by the probe tip must be focused through a lens to the detector instead of travelling through an optical fiber. The instrument can be operated in constant height or constant force mode and resolution is limited to 10–50 nm due to tip convolution. Since the optical signal obtained in PSTM is affected by the optical properties of the sample as well as topography, comparison of the PSTM data with AFM data allows determination of the absorbance of the sample. In one study, the 514 nm absorbance of a Langmuir-Blodgett film of 10,12-pentacosadiynoic acid (PCA) was recorded using this method.

=== Photo-conductive imaging with atomic force/electron scanning tunneling microscopy ===
PSTM can be combined with both electron scanning tunneling microscope and AFM in order to simultaneously record optical, conductive, and topological information of a sample. This experimental apparatus, published by Iwata et al., allows the characterization of semiconductors such as photovoltaics, as well as other photo-conductive materials. The experimental configuration utilizes a cantilever consisting of a bent optical fiber sharpened to a tip diameter of less than 100 nm, coated with an ITO layer, and a thin Au layer. Hence, the fiber probe acts as the AFM cantilever for force sensing, is optically conductive to record optical data, and electrically conductive to record current from the sample. The signals from the three detection methods are recorded simultaneously and independently in order to separate topographical, optical, and electrical information from the signals..

This apparatus was used to characterize copper phthalocyanine deposited over an array of gold squares patterned on an ITO substrate affixed to a prism. The prism was illuminated under total internal reflection at 636 nm, 533 nm, and 441 nm (selected from a white light laser using optical filters), allowing photo-conductive imaging at different excitation wavelengths. Copper phthalocyanine is a semiconducting organometallic compound. The conductivity of this compound is high enough for the electric current to travel through the film and tunnel into the probe tip. The photo-conductive properties of this material cause the conductivity to increase under irradiation due to an increase in the number of photo-generated charge carriers. Optical and topographical images of the sample were obtained utilizing the novel imaging technique described above. The changes in photo-conductivity of point-contact areas of the film were observed under different excitation wavelengths.
