= Jenny Hoffman =

American physicist

- Born: Jennifer Eve Hoffman
- Education: Harvard University (BA); University of California, Berkeley (MA, PhD)
- Known for: Quasiparticle interference imaging
- Awards: Fannie Cox Prize for Excellence in Science Teaching (2012)
- Scientific career
- Workplaces: Harvard University
- Thesis: A Search for Alternative Electronic Order in the High Temperature Superconductor Bi_{2}Sr_{2}CaCu_{2}O_{8+δ} by Scanning Tunneling Microscopy (2003)
- Doctoral advisor: J. C. Séamus Davis
- Sports career
- Event: Ultramarathon
Medal record
Representing United States
Ultramarathon
USATF 24 Hour National Championship
Gold medal – first place	2014 Cleveland, OH
Gold medal – first place	2015 Cleveland, OH
Gold medal – first place	2016 Cleveland, OH
IAU 24 Hour World Championship
Gold medal – first place	2017 (team) Belfast

Jennifer "Jenny" Eve Hoffman is an American physicist and a professor at Harvard University. Hoffman is interested in atomic-scale synthesis and imaging of quantum materials, using molecular beam epitaxy and scanning probe microscopy. Hoffman has received several awards for her research and teaching, including the 2005 Presidential Early Career Award for Scientists and Engineers and 2010 Sloan Research Fellowship.

== Education ==
After graduating from Greenwich Academy, Hoffman went on to study physics at Harvard University, earning a B.A. with magna cum laude distinction in 1999. She then entered the University of California, Berkeley, where she obtained an M.A. in 2001, and a Ph.D. in 2003. While a graduate student of UC Berkeley, Hoffman worked with J. C. Séamus Davis on the characterization of bismuth strontium calcium copper oxide, which became the topic of her doctoral thesis.

== Career and research ==
Hoffman joined Stanford University as a postdoctoral research associate in Kathryn Moler's group. In 2005, she joined Harvard University as an assistant professor. Hoffman's group use layer by layer growth and high-resolution imaging of molecules. Using scanning tunneling spectroscopy they explained vortex pinning in high-temperature superconductors. She is also interested in topological insulators and strongly correlated materials. She has won several large research grants, from National Science Foundation, the Alfred P. Sloan Foundation, Gordon and Betty Moore Foundation, United States – Israel Binational Science Foundation and the Air Force Research Laboratory. She has developed quasiparticle interference imaging and force microscopy to trigger electronic phase transitions.

In 2015, Hoffman joined University of British Columbia as a Canada Excellence Research Chair. The position was worth $10 million over seven years, enabling University of British Columbia to use atomic level 3D printing. She returned to Harvard University after less than a year.

== Awards ==
In 2013, the Radcliffe Institute for Advanced Study awarded her a fellowship to image complex oxides.

== Athletics ==
As an undergraduate at Harvard University, Hoffman rowed on the varsity crew team (lightweight). In her senior year, she began to run marathons, and has since taken up triathlons and ultramarathons.

Hoffman won the national title in the USA Track & Field National Championship 24 Hour Run in 2014, 2015 and 2016, and she was selected as the USATF athlete of the week in September 2016. She competed on the gold medal-winning team at the IAU 24 Hour World Championships in Belfast, UK in July 2017.

In November 2023, Hoffman set a new record for the fastest known time for a woman to run across the United States. She completed the Trans America Run from San Francisco to New York City, covering 3,032 miles, in 47 days, 12 hours, and 35 minutes.

== Personal records ==
- Marathon - 3:23:08 (Lowell, MA, 2021)
- 100 Miles - 15:26:51 (Milwaukee, WI, 2023)
- 24 Hour - 147.7673 miles (Milwaukee, WI, 2024)
- Trans America Run - 47 days, 12 hours, 35 minutes (SF to NY, 2023)
