= Frank Fahey =

Frank Fahey may refer to:

- Frank Fahey (politician) (born 1951), Irish property developer and former politician
- Frank Fahey (baseball) (1896–1954), American Major League baseball player

== See also ==
- Francis Fahy
