= Frank Fahy (physicist) =

Irish physicist, academic and administrator

- Born: 8 June 1922; Mallow, County Cork, Ireland
- Died: 24 June 2005 (aged 83)
- Education: University College Cork; University College Dublin
- Spouse: Brigid Lavelle
- Children: 3
- Scientific career
- Fields: Physics
- Workplaces: University of Chicago; Marquette University; University College Cork; Dublin Institute for Advanced Studies

Edward Francis Fahy (8 June 1922 – 24 June 2005) was an Irish physicist, academic and administrator whose long career was spent mostly at University College Cork (1952–1987). There he was head of the department of physics (1964–1987) and college Vice President (1976–1987). He also served as chair of the School of Cosmic Physics at the Dublin Institute for Advanced Studies (1970–1995).

== Early life ==
Frank, as he was always known, was born on 8 June 1922 in Mallow, County Cork in the newly independent Irish State, the youngest son of John Wall Fahy (from Kilcrea, County Cork) and Nora O'Sullivan (from Carrigeen, County Cork), who had settled in Mallow in 1915. Frank attended Saint Patrick’s National school and the Patrician Academy Secondary School, both in Mallow. In 1939, he enrolled in Engineering at University College Cork (UCC), having a keen interest in mathematics. His introduction to physics at UCC motivated a change in focus from engineering to physics, and in 1942 he graduated with a first class honours BSc in physics and mathematics.

== Career ==
With encouragement from Professor John McHenry, then head of the physics department at UCC, he went to study at University College Dublin (UCD), and in 1944 completed his MSc there, with a thesis on "Problems on Atmospheric Electricity" done under the direction of P. J. Nolan. The same year, he was awarded a National University of Ireland (NUI) Travelling Studentship in physics, but due to WWII he first spent a year at Dublin Institute for Advanced Studies (DIAS). The visiting programme gave him the opportunity to learn from many of the leading physicists of the day including Schrödinger, Dirac, Born and Heitler. It was a productive year in which he also met his future wife, Brigid (Bridie) Lavelle, from County Donegal.

In October 1945 he arrived at the University of Chicago, at that time a world centre of nuclear physics where he had the opportunity to learn from Fermi, Teller and others. He was particularly influenced by Fermi, and he later adopted a similar presentation style whose goal was always to simplify and demystify physics. In 1951, he was awarded his PhD for a thesis on "Investigations on Large Cosmic-ray Bursts" done under Marcel Schein.

In 1950 he accepted a position as assistant professor in the physics department at Marquette University Milwaukee, Wisconsin, where his young family settled. In 1948 he had married Bridie Lavelle in Chicago, and by the time he returned to UCC in 1952, the couple had three children.

At UCC in the 1950s and 1960s, Frank turned his attention to expanding and enhancing the physics teaching programme there, especially at the undergraduate level. He became Professor of Physics in 1961, and department head in 1964, a position he held until his retirement in 1987. He was Vice President of UCC (1976–1987) and served as chair of the School of Cosmic Physics at DIAS (1970–1995). In the 1960s he led work to increase the physical facilities and staff of his department, leading to the design and construction of a new science building to house the departments of Experimental and Mathematical Physics, Chemistry, Mathematics and Statistics. This allowed UCC to address the significant growth in student numbers.

Numerous UCC physics graduates successfully pursued PhDs in top research institutions abroad and are now leaders in their own right, e.g., Seamus Davis (Cornell), Margaret Murnane (Colorado), Richard Milner (MIT), Pat O’Shea (Maryland and UCC), Denjoe O’Connor (DIAS), and Stephen Fahy (UCC). Through his work with the Royal Irish Academy National Commission for the Teaching of Physics, he introduced the use of SI (Système Internationale) units to simplify and avoid confusion in physics; also developing teachign an approach to electromagnetism that was later part of the textbook ‘Understanding Physics’, written by his colleagues, Michael Mansfield and Colm O’Sullivan.

His own publications were eclectic, touching on physics, relativity and mathematics.

== Publications ==
- P. J. Nolan and E. F. Fahy, "Experiments on the Conductivity of Atmospheric Air", Proceedings of the Royal Irish Academy. Section A: Mathematical and Physical Sciences, Vol. 50 (1944/1945), pp. 233–256
- P. J. Nolan and E. F. Fahy, "The Removal of Radon from Atmospheric Air by Filtering", Proceedings of the Royal Irish Academy. Section A: Mathematical and Physical Sciences, Vol. 50 (1944/1945), pp. 257–260.
- Edward F. Fahy and Marcel Schein, "Observations on Large Cosmic-Ray Bursts at an Altitude of 3500 Meters", Phys. Rev. 75, 207 – Published 1 January 1949
- Edward F. Fahy, "Investigations of Large Cosmic-Ray Bursts", University of Chicago, Phys. Rev. 83, 2 – Published 15 July 1951, American Physical Society
- Edward F. Fahy and Frank G. Karioris, "Geometrical and Graphical Representations of Lissajous Figures", Amer. J. Phys, Vol 20, No 3, 121–123, March 1952
- E. F. Fahy and M A MacConaill, "Optical Properties of ‘Cellophane’ ", Nature 178, 1072–1073, 10 November 1956
- E. F. Fahy, "The clock paradox in relativity". Austral. J. Phys.2 1958 586–587.
- E. F. Fahy, E. F. "Aberration of Plane Waves", Nature, Vol 188, No 4748, 396–397, 29 October 1960.
- E. F. Fahy, "On the tight packing of equal spheres and associated problems in flat N-dimensional space". Amer. J. Phys. 29, 725–728, 1961
- J. Foley, M. L. Ó Sé, and E. F. Fahy, "The Resistance of Butter to Penetration", Proc. 16th Int. Dairy Congress, 42–48, Copenhagen 1962.
