= Pete Kostelnick =

American ultramarathon runner

Personal information
- Nationality: American
- Born: September 12, 1987 (age 38) Boone, Iowa
- Spouse: Lindsay Kostelnick

Sport
- Sport: Ultramarathon

Achievements and titles
- World finals: Fastest run across the United States, 42 days, 6 hours, 30 minutes
- Updated on 25 October 2016

Pete Kostelnick (born September 12, 1987) is an American ultramarathon runner most well known for his world record for fastest coast-to-coast crossing of the United States by foot, in 42 days, six hours and 30 minutes. He is a two time Badwater Ultramarathon champion, and the 5th fastest North American, all-time, at the 24-hour run, covering 163.5 miles (an average pace of 8:48 per mile).

== Coast-to-coast run ==
On September 12, 2016, Kostelnick set out to break the record for the United States coast-to-coast (3,100 mile) Trans America Run, starting at San Francisco City Hall and ending at New York City's City Hall.

The previous record was 46 days, eight hours and 36 minutes, set in 1980 by Frank Giannino Jr. Giannino noted that he felt "nostalgic" watching Kostelnick break his record, and commented that he was impressed with how fast Kostelnick was running, nine and a half minutes per mile. Giannino had traversed America much slower, often walking, during his record, but only slept 6 hours a night, which allowed him to cover similar ground at the much slower pace of 11 plus minutes per mile.

Throughout Kostelnick's crossing, he gathered local runners to join him, promoting health and fitness.

During his attempt he faced many hardships, including snowstorms, 35 mile per hour winds, and a major motor accident destroying his support vehicle (which provided food and hydration).

Several other ultramarathon runners have attempted to break the record, but have failed. A recent attempt by Robert Young was plagued by allegations of cheating, although he did not finish the distance anyway. To emphasize accountability, so there was no question about the legitimacy of the record, Kostelnick ran with a satellite transceiver which recorded his exact location at all times. He also wore two GPS watches—in case one failed—and his team gathered witness signatures, took videos and photos, and assembled media reports daily.
