= Michael F. Crommie =

American physicist and professor (born 1961)

Michael Crommie
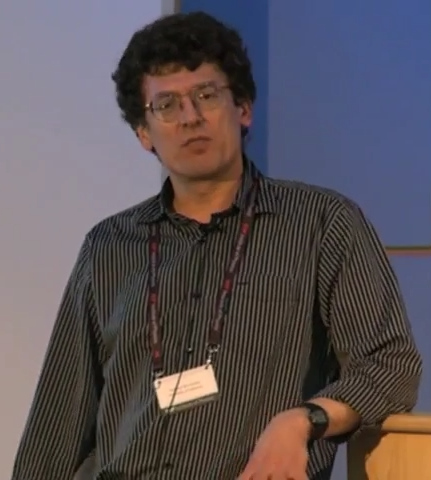
- Crommie in 2011
- Born: Michael F. Crommie; December 1961 (age 64); Beverly, Massachusetts, U.S.
- Education: University of California, Los Angeles (BS); University of California, Berkeley (PhD)
- Known for: Quasiparticle interference imaging; Quantum corral
- Scientific career
- Fields: Condensed matter physics
- Workplaces: Lawrence Berkeley National Laboratory; University of California, Berkeley
- Doctoral advisor: Alex Zettl

Michael F. Crommie (born December 1961) is an American physicist. He is a professor of physics at the University of California, Berkeley. Renowned for his research on condensed-matter physics, he is a recipient of both the Newcomb-Cleveland Prize and the Davisson–Germer Prize in Atomic Physics. Crommie currently directs the Crommie Research Group.

== Education ==
Crommie completed his undergraduate studies at the University of California, Los Angeles, earning a bachelor's degree in physics in 1984. He completed his doctoral studies under Alex Zettl at UC Berkeley, receiving a Ph.D. in physics in 1991, and was a postdoctoral fellow at IBM under Don Eigler. In 2007, he was elected as a fellow of the American Physical Society.

== Research ==
Crommie's research group currently uses scanning tunneling microscopy and scanning tunneling spectroscopy. Crommie is known for demonstrating the quantum corral in 1993 with Christopher Lutz and Don Eigler by using an elliptical ring of cobalt atoms on a copper surface. The ferromagnetic cobalt atoms reflected the surface electrons of the copper inside the ring into a wave pattern, as predicted by the theory of quantum mechanics.

== See also ==
- Wolf-Dieter Schneider
- Roberto Car
- Eberhard Umbach
- Andreas J. Heinrich
- Ulrike Diebold
