= Karina Morgenstern =

German physicist (born 1968)

- Born: February 12, 1968 (age 58); Bonn, West Germany
- Education: Ruhr University Bochum; University of Hanover
- Scientific career
- Fields: Physics
- Workplaces: University of Bonn; Free University of Berlin

Karina Morgenstern (born 12 February 1968 in Bonn) is a German physicist. She is a professor of physical chemistry at the Ruhr University Bochum.

== Education ==
She studied physics and computer science at the universities of Bonn and Knoxville. She was awarded a diploma in physics in 1993 (Forschungszentrum Jülich and University of Bonn), and a diploma in computer science in 1994 (GMD Forschungszentrum Informationstechnik and University of Bonn). She then obtained a doctoral degree in surface physics in 1996 (Forschungszentrum Jülich and University of Bonn) and completed her habilitation in experimental physics in 2002 (Free University of Berlin).

== Career ==
Morgenstern was a researcher at the University of Aarhus in 1996, then at the University of Lausanne from 1996 to 1999 and at the Free University of Berlin from 1999 to 2003. She then became a professor of solid state physics at the University of Hannover in 2005 and from 2012 she was a professor of physical chemistry at the Ruhr University Bochum. Since 2018, she has been the director of the DFG graduate school "Confinement-controlled Chemistry" and the dean of the department of chemistry and biochemistry.

== Awards and fellowships ==
- Günther Leibfried Prize 1997 of Forschungszentrums Jülich for an outstanding doctoral thesis.
- Hertha Sponer Prize 2002 (inaugural winner) of the German Physical Society for dynamic scanning tunneling microscopy of nanostructures, which she also dealt with in her thesis.
- Heisenberg fellowship 2003–2005 of the German Research Foundation

== Selected bibliography ==
- Calle-Vallejo, F.; Tymoczko, J.; Colic, V.; Vu, Q. H.; Pohl, M. D.; Morgenstern, K.; Loffreda, D.; Sautet, P.; Schuhmann, W.; Bandarenka, A. S. (8 October 2015). "Finding optimal surface sites on heterogeneous catalysts by counting nearest neighbors". Science. 350 (6257): 185–189. Bibcode:2015Sci...350..185C. doi:10.1126/science.aab3501. PMID 26450207. S2CID 2014550.
- Michaelides, Angelos; Morgenstern, Karina (17 June 2007). "Ice nanoclusters at hydrophobic metal surfaces". Nature Materials. 6 (8): 597–601. doi:10.1038/nmat1940. PMID 17572679.
- Henzl, Jörg; Mehlhorn, Michael; Gawronski, Heiko; Rieder, Karl-Heinz; Morgenstern, Karina (16 January 2006). "Reversiblecis-trans Isomerization of a Single Azobenzene Molecule". Angewandte Chemie International Edition. 45 (4): 603–606. doi:10.1002/anie.200502229. PMID 16345104.
- Böhringer, Matthias; Morgenstern, Karina; Schneider, Wolf-Dieter; Berndt, Richard; Mauri, Francesco; De Vita, Alessandro; Car, Roberto (12 July 1999). "Two-Dimensional Self-Assembly of Supramolecular Clusters and Chains". Physical Review Letters. 83 (2): 324–327. Bibcode:1999PhRvL..83..324B. doi:10.1103/PhysRevLett.83.324. S2CID 121726860.
- Morgenstern, Karina; Rosenfeld, Georg; Poelsema, Bene; Comsa, George (13 March 1995). "Brownian Motion of Vacancy Islands on Ag(111)". Physical Review Letters. 74 (11): 2058–2061. Bibcode:1995PhRvL..74.2058M. doi:10.1103/PhysRevLett.74.2058. PMID 10057831.

== See also ==
- Wolf-Dieter Schneider
- Michael F. Crommie
- Ulrike Diebold
