= Succi =

== People ==
Succi is an Italian surname. Notable people with the surname include:

- Belén Succi (born 1985), Argentine field hockey player
- Davide Succi (born 1981), Italian footballer
- Sauro Succi, Italian physicist

== Ancient history ==
- Succi was the name in antiquity for the Gate of Trajan, a mountain pass in Bulgaria

== See also ==
- 13689 Succi, a main-belt asteroid
