= Alexander Szameit =

German physicist

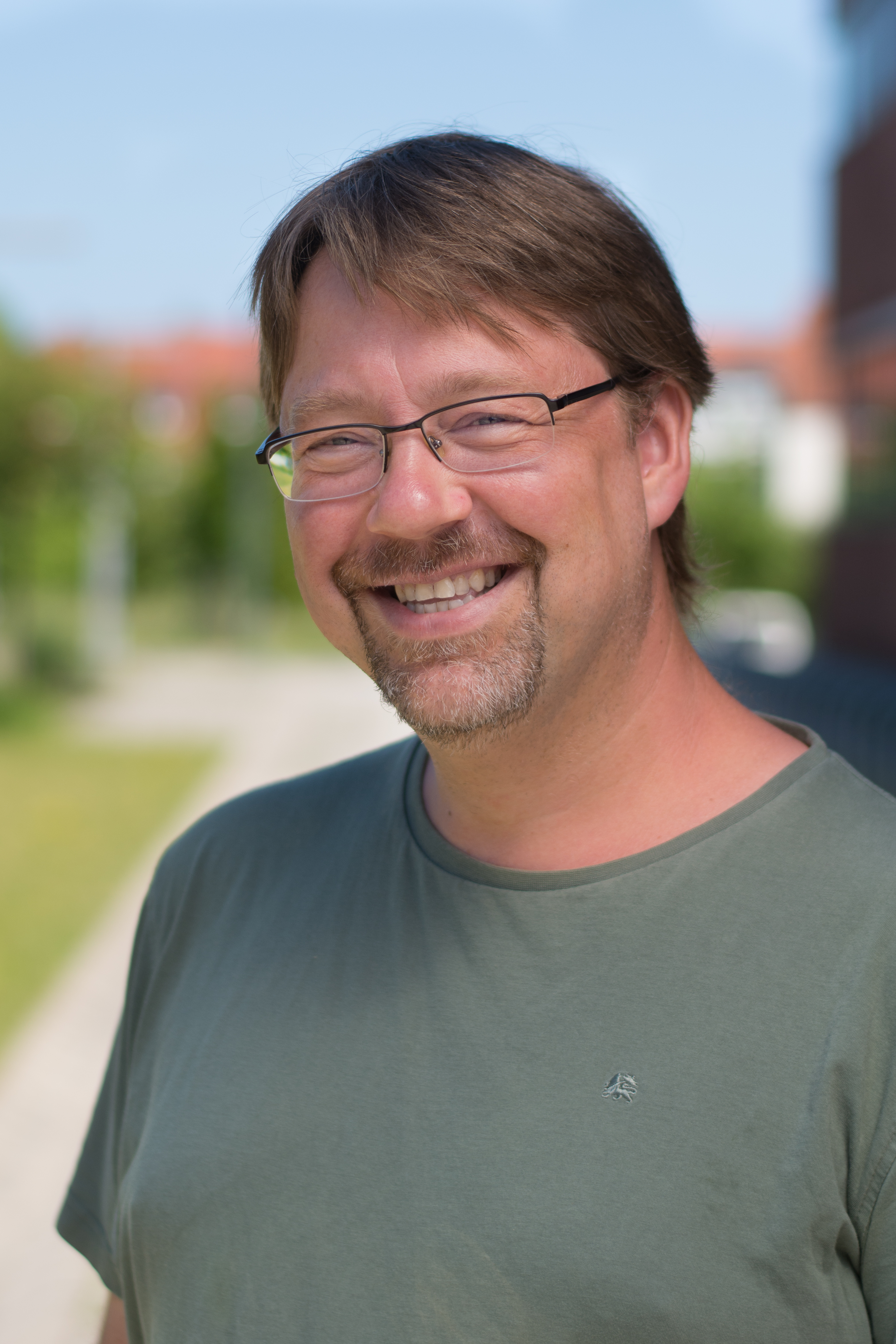
- Born: January 10, 1979 (age 47); Halle (Saale), Germany
- Education: University of Jena
- Known for: Topological photonics Quantum optics nonlinear optics
- Scientific career
- Fields: Physicist
- Workplaces: University of Rostock

Alexander Szameit (born 10 January 1979) is a German physicist working in experimental solid-state optics.

== Biography ==
Szameit studied physics at the Martin Luther University of Halle-Wittenberg and the University of Jena, graduating in 2004. Following that, from 2004 to 2007 he pursued a doctoral degree at the University of Jena, graduating with the highest honor of "summa cum laude". From 2009 he worked at the Technion in Haifa as a postdoctoral researcher in the group of Mordechai Segev. In 2011 he returned to the University of Jena as a junior professor and acquired his habilitation in 2015. Since 2016, he is a professor at the University of Rostock, where he leads the Experimental Solid-state Optics group. Since 2022, Szameit also serves on the board of the German Research Foundation's collaborative research center 1477 "LiMatI"

== Research ==
Szameit's work focuses on the investigation of optical wave phenomena in discrete systems. As experimental platforms, he utilizes artificial structured media such as arrays of coupled optical waveguides directly inscribed into glass chips by ultrafast laser pulses, or synthetic mesh lattices implemented by time-multiplexed loops of optical fibers. Using these techniques, his research covers a broad range of fields ranging from topological photonics, non-Hermitian and PT-symmetric optical systems, integrated quantum photonics and nonlinear optics to synthetic dimensions and the emulation of relativistic physics in on-chip light-based settings.

== Awards and honors ==
- 2009: Doctoral prize of the DPG (German Physical Society)
- 2014: Adolph Lomb Medal of the Optical Society
- 2015: Rudolf Kaiser award for experimental physics
- 2017: Alfried Krupp prize of the Alfried Krupp von Bohlen und Halbach Foundation
- 2020: Tomassoni award
- 2024: Elected as fellow of Optica

== Selected publications ==
- Rechtsman, Mikael C., Julia M. Zeuner, Yonatan Plotnik, Yaakov Lumer, Daniel Podolsky, Felix Dreisow, Stefan Nolte, Mordechai Segev, and Alexander Szameit. "Photonic Floquet topological insulators." Nature 496, no. 7444 (2013): 196–200.
- Weimann, Steffen, Manuel Kremer, Yonatan Plotnik, Yaakov Lumer, Stefan Nolte, Konstantinos G. Makris, Mordechai Segev, Mikael C. Rechtsman, and Alexander Szameit. "Topologically protected bound states in photonic parity–time-symmetric crystals." Nature materials 16, no. 4 (2017): 433–438.
- Tillmann, Max, Borivoje Dakić, René Heilmann, Stefan Nolte, Alexander Szameit, and Philip Walther. "Experimental boson sampling." Nature photonics 7, no. 7 (2013): 540–544.
- Zeuner, Julia M., Mikael C. Rechtsman, Yonatan Plotnik, Yaakov Lumer, Stefan Nolte, Mark S. Rudner, Mordechai Segev, and Alexander Szameit. "Observation of a topological transition in the bulk of a non-Hermitian system." Physical review letters 115, no. 4 (2015): 040402.
- Szameit, Alexander, and Stefan Nolte. "Discrete optics in femtosecond-laser-written photonic structures." Journal of Physics B: Atomic, Molecular and Optical Physics 43, no. 16 (2010): 163001.
