= Wolf-Dieter Schneider (physicist) =

Physicist

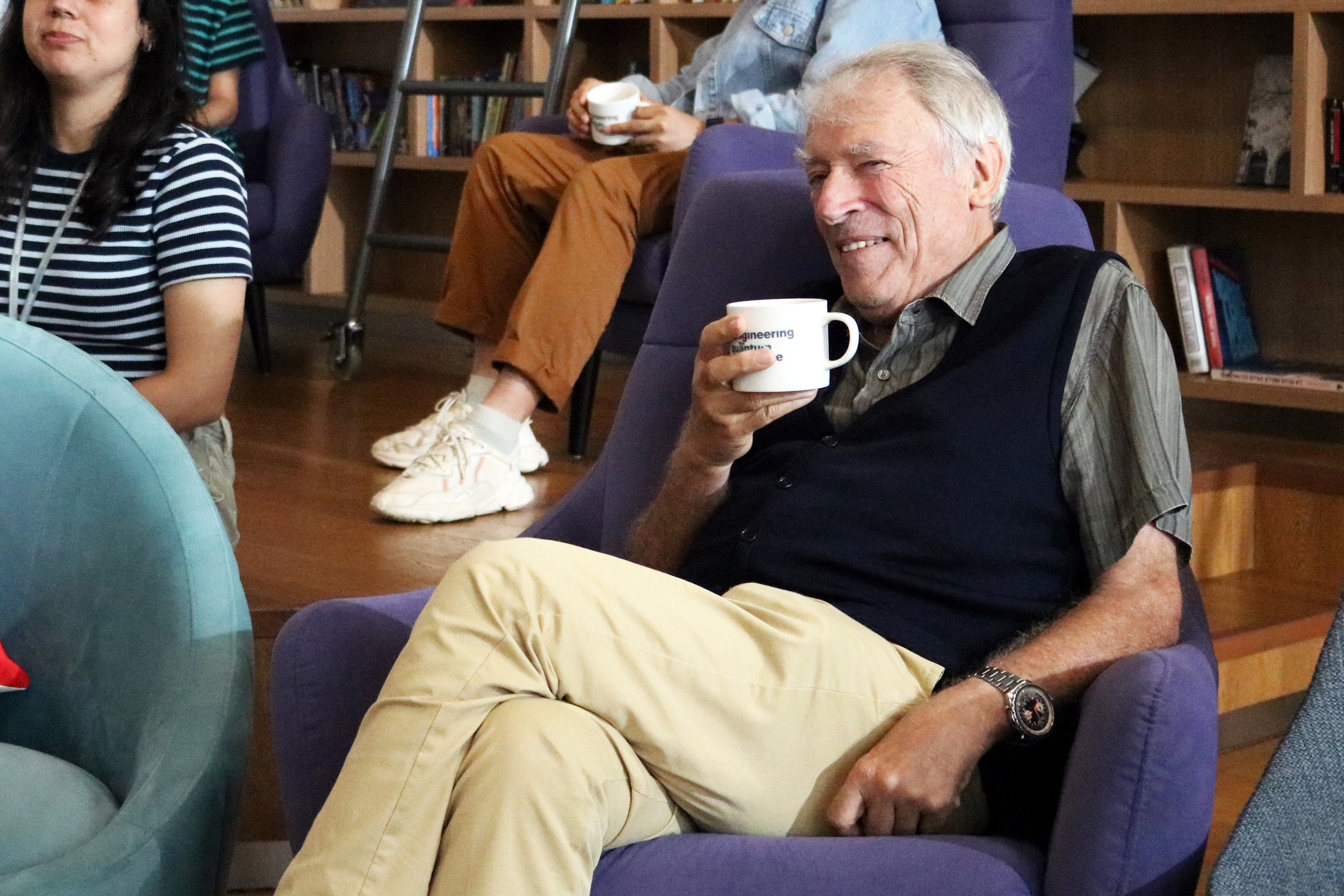
- Born: April 25, 1944; Trondheim, Norway
- Education: Privat-Docent, Dr. rer. nat.
- Alma mater: University of Neuchâtel, Free University of Berlin, University of Bonn
- Known for: "Groundbreaking contributions in the field of surface physics and surface chemistry for the understanding of transport and catalytic properties as well as the electronic and geometric structure of nanoscale systems with photoemission and scanning tunneling techniques"
- Awards: Rudolf-Jaeckel-Preis der Deutschen Vakuum Gesellschaft
- Scientific career
- Fields: Nanoscale surface physics, solid state physics, nuclear physics, condensed matter physics
- Institutions: University of Bonn, Uppsala University, École Polytechnique Fédérale de Lausanne, University of Lausanne, University of Campinas
- Thesis: E2-transition probabilities in the Zr-region measured with an orange-type iron free spectrometer at the Bonn isochron-cyclotron (1975)
- Doctoral advisor: Erwin Bodenstedt (de)
- Website: Laboratory of Physics at Surfaces - LPS

Wolf-Dieter Schneider is an experimental physicist working in the fields of nanoscale surface physics, solid state physics, nuclear physics, and condensed matter physics. He was both a full professor and later honorary professor at the University of Lausanne and École Polytechnique Fédérale de Lausanne (EPFL). At the Fritz Haber Institute of the Max Planck Society and at present at the IBS Center for Quantum Nanoscience (QNS) in Seoul he was a scientific consultant after retiring from his professorship. He has over 200 publications to his credit and speaks German, English, French, Latin and basic Portuguese.

He is known for utilizing photoemission and scanning tunneling techniques to investigate transport properties and electronic structures of nanoscale systems.

== Education ==
Majoring in physics, Wolf-Dieter graduated with both a Diplom and Dr. rer. nat. from the University of Bonn, Germany in 1971 and 1975, respectively. His academic advisor was Erwin Bodenstedt (de) and his thesis was on transition probabilities of high-spin states in nearly spherical nulei with the method of conversion electron spectroscopy after excitation of nuclear reactions at the isochroncyclotron. He completed Privat-Docent from both the Free University of Berlin in Germany and University of Neuchâtel in Switzerland in 1982 and 1985, respectively. His research focused on investigation of the electronic structure of condensed matter with electron spectroscopic methods.

== Career ==
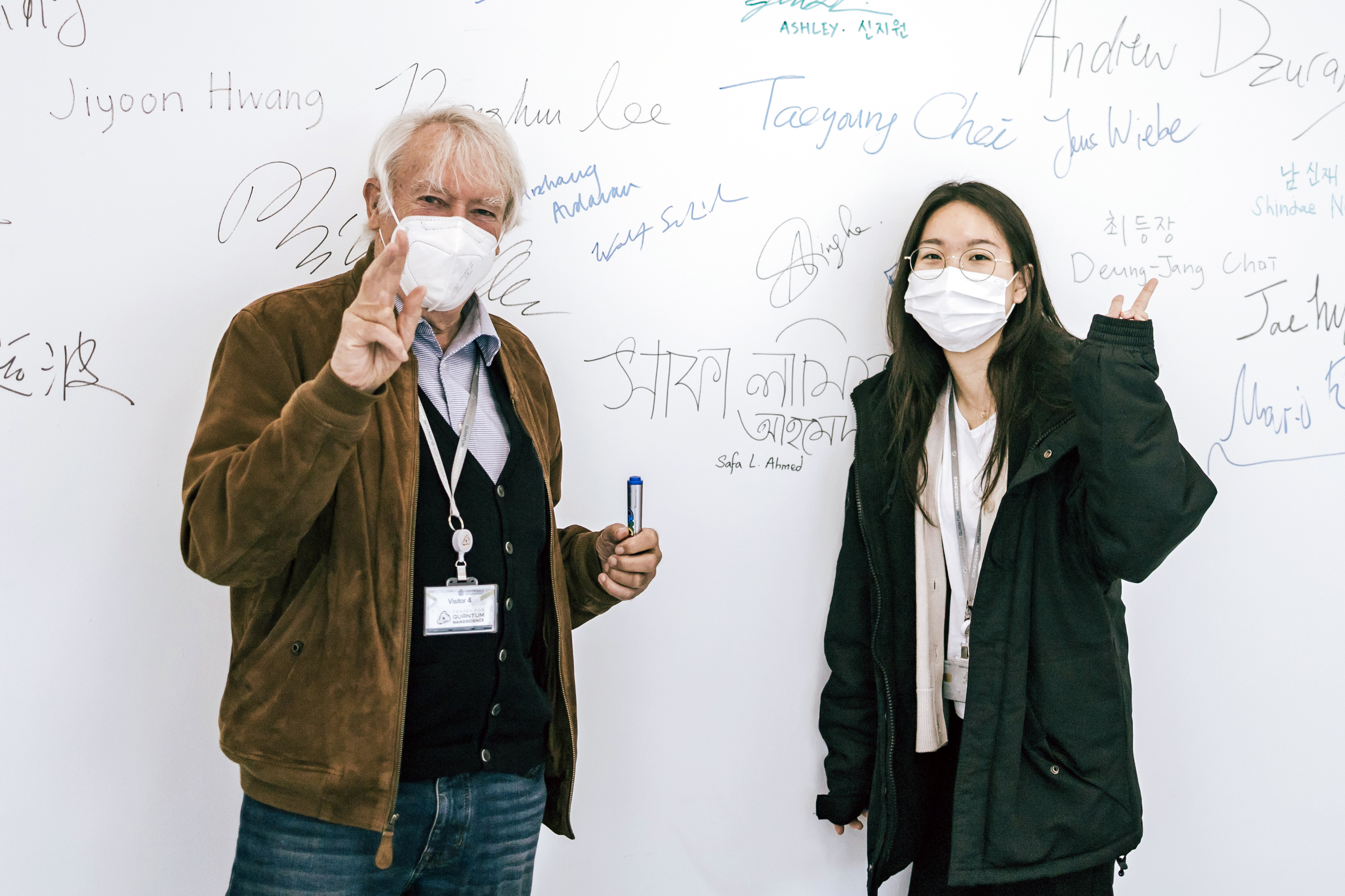
Wolf-Dieter Schneider (left) poses for a picture with Taehong Ahn (right) after giving a lecture at the Center for Quantum Nanoscience.

After completing his Dr. rer. nat., he became an assistant professor at the University of Campinas in 1976 and Free University of Berlin the following year. Upon completing his habilitation in 1982, he worked as a senior scientist under Yves Baer at the University of Neuchâtel. This is where Schneider began his work on high-resolution photoemission which led to the discovery of the Kondo resonance in Ce and in Ce heavy fermion compounds. This finding established a relation between ground state properties (resistivity, magnetism, specific heat) and high-energy spectroscopies of condensed matter. Later research included the discovery of the superconducting energy gap by photoemission techniques in a high-temperature superconductor.

He became a full professor at University of Lausanne in 1989 and later at École Polytechnique Fédérale de Lausanne. His research lab, Laboratoire de Physique des Surfaces (Laboratory of Physics at Surfaces) was founded in 1989 and research activity ceased upon his retirement in 2009. The focus of their research was the "structural, electronic, magnetic, and optical properties of supported nanostructures."

His research group detected STM-induced light emission from adsorbed C_{60} molecules at molecular resolution which was a step towards optical recognition and chemical identification of individual molecules at surfaces. They later used the technique to achieve local phosphorescence and fluorescence from fullerene molecules which enabled chemical recognition at the molecular scale. His group was among the first to detect the Kondo effect at the atomic scale, which aided efforts to exploit nanomagnetism.

As Louis Pasteur used a light microscope to guide his tweezers to separate sodium ammonium tartrate crystals in 1848, Schneider's research group used a scanning tunneling microscope to both image and separate chiral decameric clusters of 1-Nitronaphthalene. The experiments expanded nanochemistry with the ability to separate enantiomers.

They also contributed to the development of nanocatalysis by discovering atom-by-atom size-dependence of CO oxidation on deposited Au nanoclusters. While inert in larger quantities, nanoscale gold particles dispersed on oxide supports exhibit notable catalytic activity.

As electronics become smaller, understanding the behavior of ultrathin insulating layers increases in importance. His group pioneered the investigation of the electronic structure of insulators towards the ultrathin limit and found that three monolayers are sufficient to establish the electronic characteristics of the surface of a MgO-single crystal. The results suggest that the number of dielectric monolayers deposited on a metal substrate, the electronic, magnetic and chemical properties of the resulting surface could be tuned in a controlled manner.

His research group also aided in the understanding of the progression of chirality self-assembling from molecules to larger, supermolecular structures. Due to electrostatic interactions, rubrene would spontaneously create intricate homochiral architectures while ensuring only molecules of the same chirality assembled together.

Schneider has served both on the international advisory committee of the International Symposium on Atomic Level Characterization and the international scientific committee of the Symposium on Surface Science for a number of years.

== Editorial boards ==
- 2014–2021: Progress in Surface Science, associate editor
- Materials Science Forum, editorial advisory board
- e-Journal of Surface Science and NanoTechnology (e-JSSNT), editorial advisory board
- Journal of Electron Spectroscopy and Related Phenomena, guest editor
- Applied Physics A, guest editor
- New Journal of Physics, guest editor
- 2013–2019: Frontiers in Condensed Matter Physics, associate editor

== Honors, awards, and fellowships ==
In addition to a number of grants from the Swiss National Science Foundation, Wolf-Dieter has also been awarded the following:

- 1972 Jan.–April: German Academic Exchange Service (DAAD)
- 2014 October: Rudolf-Jaeckel-Preis, Deutschen Vakuum Gesellschaft (DVG)
- 2017 December: 141 Committee of the Japanese Society for the Promotion of Sciences Award
- 2022 March: Peter Varga 3S-Poster Prize 3S'22

== Selected publications ==
- Patthey, F.; Delley, Bernard; Schneider, Wolf-Dieter; Baer, Yves (30 September 1985). "Low-Energy Excitations in 𝛼- and 𝛾-Ce Observed by Photoemission". Physical Review Letters. 55 (14): 1518. doi:10.1103/PhysRevLett.55.1518.
- Imer, J-M; Patthey, F.; Dardel, B.; Schneider, Wolf-Dieter; Yves, Baer; Petroff, Y.; Zettl, Alex (16 January 1989). "High-resolution photoemission study of the low-energy excitations reflecting the superconducting state of Bi-Sr-Ca-Cu-O single crystals". Physical Review Letters. 62 (3): 336. doi:10.1103/PhysRevLett.62.336.
- Tschudy, M.; Berndt, Richard; Gaisch, R.; Gimzewski, James; Reihl, B.; Schlittler, R. R.; Schneider, Wolf-Dieter (26 November 1993). "Photon emission at molecular resolution induced by a tunneling microscope". Science. 262 (5, 138): 1, 425–1, 427. doi:10.1126/science.262.5138.142.
- Berndt, Richard; Gaisch, R.; Schneider, Wolf-Dieter; Gimzewski, James; Reihl, B.; Schlittler, R. R.; Tschudy, M. (2 January 1995). "Atomic Resolution in Photon Emission Induced by a Scanning Tunneling Microscope". Physical Review Letters. 74 (1): 102. doi:10.1103/PhysRevLett.74.102.
- Li, Jiutao; Schneider, Wolf-Dieter; Berndt, Richard; Delley, Bernard (30 March 1998). "Kondo Scattering Observed at a Single Magnetic Impurity". Physical Review Letters. 80 (13): 2893. doi:10.1103/PhysRevLett.80.2893.
- Ternes, Markus; Lutz, Christopher P.; Heinrich, Andreas J.; Schneider, Wolf-Dieter (24 April 2020). "Sensing the spin of an individual Ce adatom". Physical Review Letters. 124 (16) 167202. doi:10.1103/PhysRevLett.124.167202.
- Sanchez, A.; Abbet, S.; Heiz, U.; Schneider, Wolf-Dieter; Häkkinen, H.; Barnett, R. N.; Landman, Uzi (9 November 1999). "When gold is not noble: nanoscale gold catalysts". The Journal of Physical Chemistry A. 103 (48): 9573–9578. doi:10.1021/jp9935992.
- Böhringer, Matthias; Morgenstern, Karina; Schneider, Wolf‐Dieter; Berndt, Richard (8 March 1999). "Separation of a racemic mixture of two‐dimensional molecular clusters by scanning tunneling microscopy". Angewandte Chemie. 38 (6): 821–823. doi:10.1002/(SICI)1521-3773(19990315)38:6<821::AID-ANIE821>3.0.CO;2-A.
- Schintke, Silvia; Messerli, Stéphane; Pivetta, Marina; Patthey, François; Libioulle, Laurent; Stengel, Massimiliano; Vita, Alessandro De; Schneider, Wolf-Dieter (7 December 2001). "Insulator at the Ultrathin Limit: MgO on Ag(001)". Physical Review Letters. 87 (27) 276801. doi:10.1103/PhysRevLett.87.276801.
- Silly, Fabien; Pivetta, Marina; Ternes, Markus; Patthey, François; Pelz, Jonathan P.; Schneider, Wolf-Dieter (9 January 2004). "Creation of an Atomic Superlattice by Immersing Metallic Adatoms in a Two-Dimensional Electron Sea". Physical Review Letters. 92 (1) 016101. doi:10.1103/PhysRevLett.92.016101.

== See also ==
- Michael F. Crommie
- Andreas J. Heinrich
- Eberhard Umbach
- Uzi Landman
- Roberto Car
- Ulrike Diebold
