= Hertha Sponer Prize =

Award of the German Physical Society

The Hertha Sponer Prize is a scientific prize of the German Physical Society (German: Deutsche Physikalische Gesellschaft, DPG). It has been awarded annually since 2002 to a female scientist for outstanding scientific work in the field of physics, and was initiated by the Equal Opportunities Working Group of the DPG. The prize is intended to encourage younger female scientists by publicly recognizing them, with the hope that this recognition attracts more women to study physics. The prize consists of a certificate and award of €3,000. Nominations are for recognition of a particular work (journal article or thesis), and self-nominations are permitted.

The prize is named after the German physicist Hertha Sponer (1895–1968), who made important contributions to molecular physics and spectroscopy.

== Prizewinners ==
Former prizewinners include:

- 2002: Karina Morgenstern (Freie Universität Berlin) for dynamic scanning tunneling microscope investigations on nanostructures.
- 2003: Uta Fritze-von Alvensleben (Göttingen Observatory) for the investigation of galaxy evolution on cosmological time scales, in particular with regard to their interaction.
- 2004: Myrjam Winning (RWTH Aachen University) for contributions to metallurgy and materials science, in particular X-ray structure investigations of grain boundaries.
- 2005: Elena Vedmedenko (University of Hamburg) for outstanding work on the magnetism of nanostructures with applications in spintronics.
- 2006: Ekaterina Shamonina (University of Osnabrück) for outstanding contributions to electromagnetic metamaterials.
- 2007: Christine Silberhorn (University of Erlangen-Nuremberg) for work on quantum communication with continuous variables.
- 2008: Sylvie Roke (Max Planck Institute for Metals Research Stuttgart) for experimental and theoretical work on nonlinear optical scattering at particle surfaces.
- 2009: Corinna Kollath (École polytechnique, Paris) for theoretical studies of non-equilibrium states of ultracold boson and fermion atomic gases.
- 2010: Liu Na (University of Stuttgart) for pioneering contributions to the characterization and fabrication of three-dimensional metal nanostructures.
- 2011: Martina Hentschel (Max Planck Institute for the Physics of Complex Systems Dresden) for the theoretical investigation of mesoscopic electronic and optical systems, in particular optical microcavities and the radiation characteristics of microlasers.
- 2012: Katharina Franke (FU Berlin) for her groundbreaking work on the interaction of magnetic molecules with superconductors on the nano- and mesoscopic scale.
- 2013: Kerstin Tackmann (DESY) gor her outstanding work on the way to the detection of the Higgs boson at the Large Hadron Collider (LHC) at CERN.
- 2014: Anne Schukraft (RWTH Aachen University) for the measurement of muon neutrinos with energies up to $10^{15}$ eV with the IceCube detector.
- 2015: Ilaria Zardo (Eindhoven University of Technology) for outstanding work on understanding the lattice dynamics and electronic band structures of semiconductor nanowires with wurtzite and zincblende crystal structures.
- 2016 not awarded
- 2017: Isabelle Staude (Friedrich Schiller University Jena) in recognition of her pioneering contribution to basic research in nanophotonics.
- 2018: Karin Everschor-Sitte (University of Mainz) for her pioneering research on the theoretical understanding of topologically protected magnetic structures, the skyrmions.
- 2019: Adriana Pálffy-Buß (Max Planck Institute for Nuclear Physics) for her pioneering theoretical calculations of the interaction of high-energy radiation with atomic nuclei based on quantum effects.
- 2020: Priscilla Pani (DESY) for her essential contributions to the search for dark matter at the LHC.
- 2021: Naëmi Leo (Asociación Centro de Investigación Cooperativa en Nanociencias (CIC nanoGUNE), San Sebastián, Spain) for her outstanding contributions to the study and characterization of artificial metamaterials and ferroic systems.
- 2022: Elisabeth Fischer-Friedrich (Cluster of Excellence Physics of Life (PoL) at the Technical University of Dresden) for her outstanding theoretical and experimental contributions to the characterization of the mechanical properties of cells and protein condensates.
- 2023: Joint award to
  - Adinda de Wit (University of Zurich Physics Institute, Switzerland) for her outstanding experimental contributions to the first observation of the Higgs-b-Yukawa coupling and the precise determination of the Higgs couplings
  - Belina von Krosigk (Karlsruhe Institute of Technology) for her fundamental contributions to the direct search and understanding of dark matter through the further development of models and methodological and analytical techniques for the detection of weak signals.
- 2024: Juliane Borchert (INATECH, University of Freiburg) for her outstanding contributions to the understanding of processes for highly efficient perovskite solar cells.
- 2025: Janna Katharina Behr (German Electron Synchrotron DESY, Hamburg) for her major contributions to the search for an extended Higgs sector through Higgs decays to top quarks.
