= Crommie =

Crommie is a surname. Notable people with the surname include:

- Lige Conley (né Elijah Crommie; 1897–1937), American actor
- Michael F. Crommie, American physicist and professor
