= Aneesur Rahman Prize =

The Aneesur Rahman Prize for Computational Physics is a prize that has been awarded annually by the American Physical Society since 1993. The recipient is chosen for "outstanding achievement in computational physics research" and it is the highest award given by the APS for work in computational physics. The prize is named after Aneesur Rahman (1927–1987), pioneer of the molecular dynamics simulation method. The prize was valued at $5,000 from 2007 to 2014, and is currently valued at $10,000.

== Recipients ==
Source: American Physical Society

- 2026 Stefano Baroni
- 2025 Chris G. Van de Walle
- 2024 Gustavo E. Scuseria
- 2023 Pablo G. Debenedetti
- 2022 Giulia Galli
- 2021 Anders W. Sandvik
- 2020 Antoine Georges and Gabriel Kotliar
- 2019 Sharon C. Glotzer
- 2018 Hans Jürgen Herrmann
- 2017 Sauro Succi
- 2016 Matthias Troyer
- 2015 John D. Joannopoulos
- 2014 Robert Swendsen
- 2013 James R. Chelikowsky
- 2012 Kai-Ming Ho
- 2011 James M. Stone
- 2010 Frans Pretorius
- 2009 A. Peter Young
- 2008 Gary S. Grest
- 2007 Daan Frenkel
- 2006 David Vanderbilt
- 2005 Uzi Landman
- 2004 Farid Abraham
- 2003 Steven R. White
- 2002 David P. Landau
- 2001 Alex Zunger
- 2000 Michael John Creutz
- 1999 Michael L. Klein
- 1998 David Matthew Ceperley
- 1997 Donald H. Weingarten
- 1996 Steven Gwon Sheng Louie
- 1995 Roberto Car and Michele Parrinello
- 1994 John M. Dawson
- 1993 Kenneth G. Wilson

== See also ==
- List of American Physical Society prizes and awards
- List of physics awards
