= Sylvie Roke =

Dutch chemist and physicist specialized in photochemistry

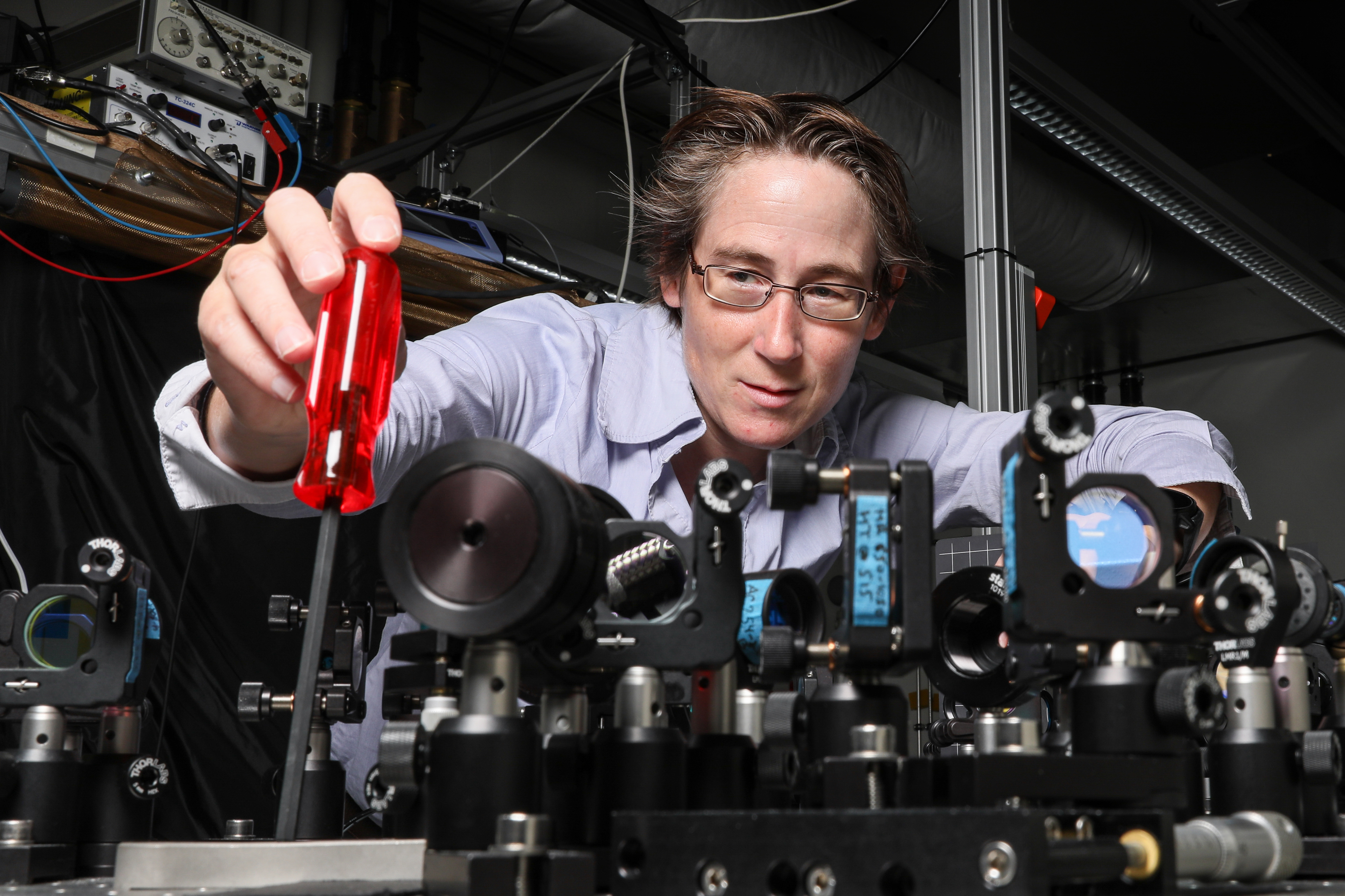
- Sylvie Roke in 2020
- Born: 1977 (age 48–49); De Bilt, Netherlands
- Known for: Water and Aqueous systems Hydrophobicity interfacial chemistry Droplets lipid membranes

Academic background
- Education: Chemistry; Physics
- Alma mater: Utrecht University; Leiden University
- Thesis: New light on hidden surfaces (2004)
- Doctoral advisor: Aart W. Kleyn; Mischa Bonn
- Other advisors: Alfons van Blaaderen; Albert Polman; Michael Grunze

Academic work
- Discipline: Physics; Chemistry
- Sub-discipline: Biophysics
- Institutions: EPFL (École Polytechnique Fédérale de Lausanne)
- Main interests: Chemical physics; Nonlinear optics; Microscopy; Ultrafast spectroscopy; Soft matter; Biophysics; Surface science
- Website: https://www.epfl.ch/labs/lbp/

Sylvie Roke (born 1977 in De Bilt, Netherlands) is a Dutch chemist and physicist specialized in photonics and aqueous systems. As a full professor she holds Julia Jacobi Chair of Photomedicine at EPFL (École Polytechnique Fédérale de Lausanne) and is the director of the Laboratory for fundamental BioPhotonics.

== Career ==
Roke studied in Utrecht, graduating from Utrecht University with degrees in chemistry (1995-2000, highest honors) and experimental physics (1997-2000, highest honors). She joined Aart W. Kleyn's Molecular Beams Group at the Institute for Atomic and Molecular Physics (AMOLF) to work on her extended master research project studying the interactions of small molecules with metal surfaces under ultrahigh vacuum conditions. Alfons van Blaaderen (chemistry) and Albert Polman (physics) where her thesis supervisors from Utrecht University. She continued as a PhD student in the Kleyn group moving to Leiden University. In 2004, she graduated with highest honors with thesis co-supervised by Mischa Bonn on "New light on hidden surfaces."

As a postdoctoral student she joined first the FOM Institute for Plasma Physics in Nieuwegein, and thereafter she worked as an Alexander von Humboldt Fellow with Michael Grunze at the Institute of Applied Physical Chemistry at Heidelberg University. In 2005, enabled by a Floating Research Group Leader position and the opportunity to set up her own laboratory from the Max-Planck Society, she moved to the Max Planck Institute for Metals Research in Stuttgart.

In 2011, she joined EPFL first as an assistant professor and was promoted as full professor in 2015. She is the holder of the Julia Jacobi Chair in Photomedicine, and the director of the Laboratory for fundamental BioPhotonics with affiliations both at the Institutes of Bioengineering and Materials (IMX) at the Schools of Engineering and of Life Sciences. In 2021, she became the director of the Institute of Bioengineering. In 2022, she got the Optica Fellow "For pioneering contributions to the theory and practice of nonlinear light scattering and imaging technologies that enable molecular level studies of complex aqueous solutions ".

== Research ==
Roke performs theoretical research and develops non-invasive label-free optical tools for the probing of aqueous systems and interfaces. Her research aims at understanding the properties of water on molecular level in diverse systems such as in aqueous electrolyte and polyelectrolyte solutions, at buried interfaces, in and outside droplets, in curved nanoscale and microscale membranes, in pores and in living cells such as neurons.

To elucidate molecular surface structures, morphologies and chirality of nano- and microscopic objects in solutions, Roke invented vibrational sum frequency scattering (SFS), a method that allows the recording the vibrational spectrum of the molecular interfacial layer around objects. She used SFS to specify the molecular interfaces of complex systems: polymer particles in a solid matrix, particles in solution, oil droplets in water (emulsions), lipid droplet like systems, water droplets, a micro-jet and liposomes in aqueous solution. Her studies indicate that objects on nano- and microscale show different behaviors as model planar interfaces.

Roke has also developed high throughput polarimetric angle resolved second harmonic scattering (AR-SHS), a method allowing for probing particle interfaces and liquids. Making use of non-resonant second harmonic response of water and its response to electrostatic fields, Roke developed a method to determine the surface potential from particle interfaces and the amount of oriented water.The technique has been used to measure the direct interaction of pore-forming toxins such as perfringolysin O and aerolysin with liposomes.

By investigating aqueous solutions, she discovered long-range interactions of ions and water that stem from the influence of the ionic electrostatic field on the water-water hydrogen bonds. Roke found that these interactions are amplified in viscoelastic liquids made of polyelectrolytes such Hyaluronan, and furthermore correlate with the viscosity of such liquids. She developed high-throughput wide field multiphoton microscopy with an about thousand fold increased signal to noise ratio when compared to standard multiphoton confocal imaging systems. A further advantage of this method is a reduction of the photodamage effect in living cells. This allows for the spatiotemporal imaging of interfacial water in various systems: imaging water undergoing surface chemical reactions, electro-catalysis, membrane water and the restructuring of water inside ion channels and activated living mammalian neurons. The latter enables a new way of measuring membrane potentials and ion fluxes in neurons using water as a probe.

== Distinctions ==
Roke is the winner for several ERC grants: ERC Synergy Grant (2020; with Aurélien Roux, University of Geneva), ERC Proof of Concept Grant (2020), ERC Consolidator Grant (2014), ERC Starting Grant (2009)

She is an elected fellow of the American Physical Society (APS; 2020) and of OPTICA (2022). She is a fellow of the Young Academy of the Berlin-Brandenburg Academy of Sciences and Humanities (2010) and the German Academy of Natural Scientists, Leopoldina (2010), a young fellow at the Werner von Siemens Ring, and was selected for the Excellence Network of the Robert-Bosch Foundation.

She is the recipient of the Hertha Sponer Prize of the German Physical Society (2008), the Minerva Prize by the Dutch Foundation for Fundamental Research on Matter (2006), and the L. J. Oosterhoff prize by the Leiden University.

Roke has been involved in the creation of the start-up companies ORYL photonics and Matis.

== Selected works ==
- Didier, M. E. P.; Tarun, O. B.; Jourdain, P.; Magistretti, P.; Roke, S. (2018). "Membrane water for probing neuronal membrane potentials and ionic fluxes at the single cell level". Nature Communications. 9 (1): 5287. Bibcode:2018NatCo...9.5287D. doi:10.1038/s41467-018-07713-w. PMC 6289965. PMID 30538243.
- Tarun, Orly B.; Hannesschläger, Christof; Pohl, Peter; Roke, Sylvie (2018). "Label-free and charge-sensitive dynamic imaging of lipid membrane hydration on millisecond time scales". Proceedings of the National Academy of Sciences. 115 (16): 4081–4086. Bibcode:2018PNAS..115.4081T. doi:10.1073/pnas.1719347115. PMC 5910843. PMID 29610320.
- Zdrali, Evangelia; Chen, Yixing; Okur, Halil I.; Wilkins, David M.; Roke, Sylvie (2017). "The Molecular Mechanism of Nanodroplet Stability". ACS Nano. 11 (12): 12111–12120. doi:10.1021/acsnano.7b05100. PMID 29224343.
- Macias-Romero, Carlos; Nahalka, Igor; Okur, Halil I.; Roke, Sylvie (2017). "Optical imaging of surface chemistry and dynamics in confinement". Science. 357 (6353): 784–788. arXiv:1707.00590. doi:10.1126/science.aal4346. PMID 28729352. S2CID 34685165.
- Smolentsev, Nikolay; Smit, Wilbert J.; Bakker, Huib J.; Roke, Sylvie (2017). "The interfacial structure of water droplets in a hydrophobic liquid". Nature Communications. 8 15548. Bibcode:2017NatCo...815548S. doi:10.1038/ncomms15548. PMC 5458086. PMID 28537259.
- Chen, Yixing; Okur, Halil I.; Gomopoulos, Nikolaos; Macias-Romero, Carlos; Cremer, Paul S.; Petersen, Poul B.; Tocci, Gabriele; Wilkins, David M.; Liang, Chungwen; Ceriotti, Michele; Roke, Sylvie (2016). "Electrolytes induce long-range orientational order and free energy changes in the H-bond network of bulk water". Science Advances. 2 (4) e1501891. Bibcode:2016SciA....2E1891C. doi:10.1126/sciadv.1501891. PMC 4846452. PMID 27152357.
- Smolentsev, Nikolay; Lütgebaucks, Cornelis; Okur, Halil I.; De Beer, Alex G. F.; Roke, Sylvie (2016). "Intermolecular Headgroup Interaction and Hydration as Driving Forces for Lipid Transmembrane Asymmetry". Journal of the American Chemical Society. 138 (12): 4053–4060. doi:10.1021/jacs.5b11776. PMID 26938772.
- Scheu, Rüdiger; Rankin, Blake M.; Chen, Yixing; Jena, Kailash C.; Ben-Amotz, Dor; Roke, Sylvie (2014). "Charge Asymmetry at Aqueous Hydrophobic Interfaces and Hydration Shells". Angewandte Chemie. 126 (36): 9714–9717. Bibcode:2014AngCh.126.9714S. doi:10.1002/ange.201310266.
- Scheu, Rüdiger; Rankin, Blake M.; Chen, Yixing; Jena, Kailash C.; Ben-Amotz, Dor; Roke, Sylvie (2014). "Charge Asymmetry at Aqueous Hydrophobic Interfaces and Hydration Shells". Angewandte Chemie International Edition. 53 (36): 9560–9563. doi:10.1002/anie.201310266. PMID 25045022.
- De Beer, Alex G. F.; Roke, Sylvie (2009). "Nonlinear Mie theory for second-harmonic and sum-frequency scattering". Physical Review B. 79 (15) 155420. Bibcode:2009PhRvB..79o5420D. doi:10.1103/PhysRevB.79.155420.
