= Uzi Landman =

American physicist

Uzi Landman (Hebrew: עוזי לנדמן; May 1944) is an Israeli/American computational physicist, the Fuller E. Callaway Professor of Computational Materials Science at the Georgia Institute of Technology.

== Career ==
He earned a B.Sc. in chemistry at the Hebrew University, Jerusalem in 1965, an M.Sc. in chemistry from the Weizmann Institute in 1966 and a D.Sc. from the Israel Institute of Technology in 1969. His research interests included surface and materials science, solid state physics and nanoscience.

He joined the faculty of Georgia Tech in 1977 as an associate professor of physics and made professor in 1979, In 1988 he was promoted to regents professor of physics, a title he still holds. In 1992 he became director of the Center for Computational Materials science, at Georgia and in 1995 appointed Fuller E. Callaway endowed Chair in Computational Materials Science.

== Honors and awards ==
In 1989, he was elected a Fellow of the American Physical Society "for applications of numerical simulation modeling of both the status structure and nonequilibrium dynamics of solid surfaces, interfaces, and small clusters"

In 2000, he was awarded the Feynman Prize in Nanotechnology by the Foresight Institute.

In 2005, he received the Aneesur Rahman Prize for Computational Physics, which is the highest honor given by the American Physical Society for work in computational physics. He was also awarded the 2008 Humboldt Research Award for Senior U.S. Scientists.

== See also ==
- Wolf-Dieter Schneider
- Roberto Car
- Eberhard Umbach
- Andreas J. Heinrich
- Ulrike Diebold
