= Farid F. Abraham =

American scientist (born 1937)

Farid F. Abraham (born May 5, 1937) is an American scientist.

He has pioneered new methods of using computer modeling in the fields of fracture mechanics, membrane dynamics and phase transformation behavior of matter. He has written two textbooks and over 200 papers published in international journals. He won the Aneesur Rahman Prize in Computational Physics, which is the highest prize in computational physics given by the American Physical Society.

== Biography ==
Abraham is a native of Phoenix, Arizona and received both his B.S. (1959) and Ph.D. (1962) degrees in physics from the University of Arizona. He spent two postdoctoral years (1962–63) at the Enrico Fermi Institute at the University of Chicago and two years as a research scientist at the Lawrence Livermore National Laboratory in California. He joined IBM in 1966 as a staff member at its Palo Alto Scientific Center. In 1971, he was named the first Consulting Professor at Stanford University and developed a graduate course in computational applied science in its Materials Science Department. In 1972, he moved to the IBM Research Division's San Jose Research Laboratory, known since 1985 as the Almaden Research Center. This laboratory remained his main intellectual base for the following three decades. During 1994, he held the Sandoval Vallarta Chair at the Universidad Autonoma Metropolitana in Mexico City.

For the period of 1995 to 2003, he was awarded several computer grants at the National Science Foundation Computational Centers and Department of Defence Grand Challenge Grants at the Maui High Performance Computing Center (MHPCC). He has been awarded several IBM Outstanding Technical Achievement Awards. He is a Fellow of the American Physical Society and, in 1998/99, was an American Physical Society Centennial Speaker. He was the Chair of the American Physical Society's Division of Computational Physics in 2000-2001. He was elected the recipient of the Alexander von Humboldt Research Award for Senior Scientists. In March 2004, he received the Aneesur Rahman Prize for Computational Physics from the American Physical Society. Retiring from IBM in 2004, he joined Lawrence Livermore National Laboratory as a Senior Scientist and was named the Graham-Perdue Visiting Professor at The University of Georgia. In 2010, he retired from LLNL. For over four decades he has pursued a wide range of computational physics applications, mainly in condensed matter physics and chemical physics. In 2002, Abraham and collaborators performed a multimillion-atom simulation of rapid brittle fracture using the ASCI White supercomputer at Lawrence Livermore National Laboratory. The simulation simulated crack propagation at the atomic scale and reported conditions under which cracks propagated faster than conventional sound speeds. The study found that crack behavior was governed by local nonlinear wave speeds and described large-scale atomistic simulation as a "computational microscope" for investigating materials failure.

- Abraham, Farid F., and Tiller, William A. (1972) An Introduction to Computer Simulation in Applied Science. New York: Plenum Press.
- Abraham, Farid F. (1974) Homogeneous Nucleation Theory, New York: Academic Press
