= Quantum mirage =

Result in quantum chaos

In physics, a quantum mirage is a peculiar result in quantum chaos. Every system of quantum dynamical billiards will exhibit an effect called scarring, where the quantum probability density shows traces of the paths a classical billiard ball would take. For an elliptical arena, the scarring is particularly pronounced at the foci, as this is the region where many classical trajectories converge. The scars at the foci are colloquially referred to as the "quantum mirage".

The quantum mirage was first experimentally observed by Hari Manoharan, Christopher Lutz and Donald Eigler at the IBM Almaden Research Center in San Jose, California in 2000. The effect is quite remarkable but in general agreement with prior work on the quantum mechanics of dynamical billiards in elliptical arenas.

== Quantum corral ==
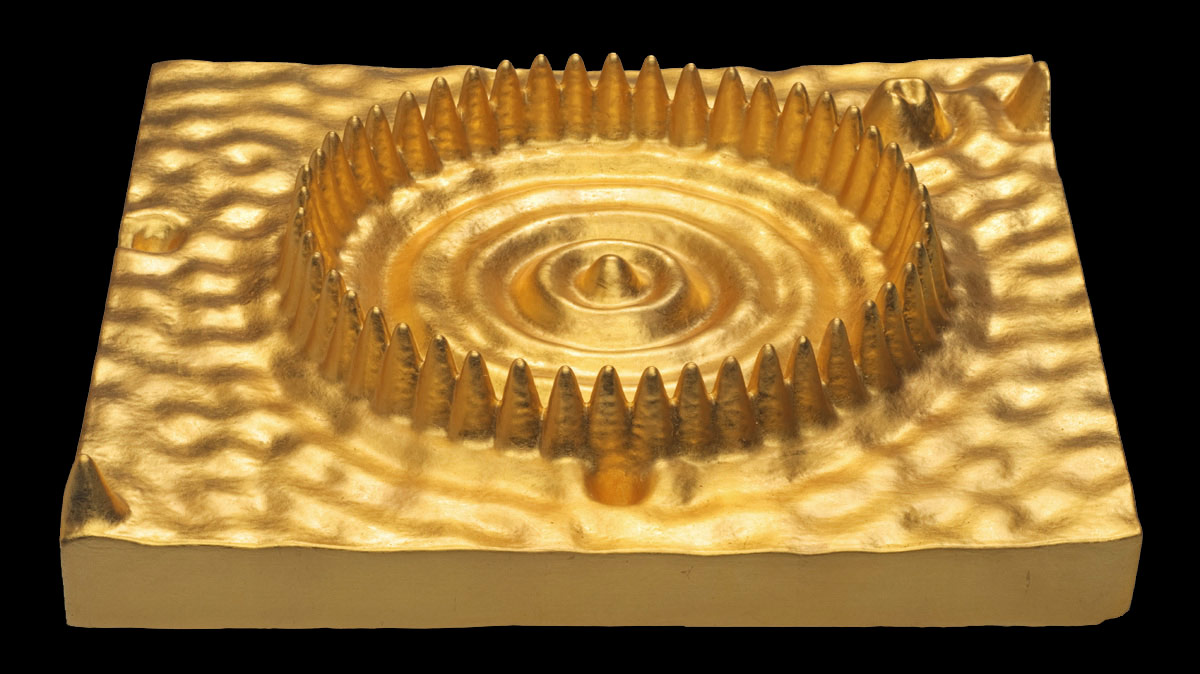
The Well (Quantum Corral) (2009) by Julian Voss-Andreae. Created using the 1993 experimental data by Lutz et al., the gilded sculpture was pictured in a 2009 review of the art exhibition "Quantum Objects" in the journal Nature.

The mirage occurs at the foci of a quantum corral, a ring of atoms arranged in an arbitrary shape on a substrate. The quantum corral was demonstrated in 1993 by Lutz, Eigler, and Crommie using an elliptical ring of iron atoms on a copper surface using the tip of a low-temperature scanning tunneling microscope to manipulate individual atoms. The ferromagnetic iron atoms reflected the surface electrons of the copper inside the ring into a wave pattern, as predicted by the theory of quantum mechanics.

Quantum corrals can be viewed as artificial atoms that even show similar chemical bonding properties as real atoms.

The size and shape of the corral determine its quantum states, including the energy and distribution of the electrons. To make conditions suitable for the mirage, the team at Almaden chose a configuration of the corral which concentrated the electrons at the foci of the ellipse.

When scientists placed a magnetic cobalt atom at one focus of the corral, a mirage of the atom appeared at the other focus. Specifically the same electronic properties were present in the electrons surrounding both foci, even though the cobalt atom was only present at one focus. In scanning tunneling microscopy, an atomically sharp metal tip is advanced towards the atomically flat sample surface until electron tunneling out of the atom and into the advancing tip becomes effective. Using the sharp tip, we can also arrange atoms adsorbed on the surface into unique shapes; for example, 48 adsorbed iron atoms on Cu(111) arranged into a 14.26 nm diameter circle. The electrons on the copper surface are trapped inside the circle formed by the iron atoms. A standing wave pattern emerges with a large peak at the center due to the constructive interference of electrons on the copper surface as they scatter off the adsorbed iron atoms.
