= Laura Na Liu =

Chinese physicist

Laura Na Liu (born 1979) is a Chinese physicist focused on researching nano-optics of three-dimensional meta materials as it applies to biology and chemistry. After receiving her undergraduate and master's degree in China, she has had many global opportunities for education and research including Germany and the United States of America. Today, she is a professor at University of Stuttgart in Germany. She has received several awards for her contributions in the field of optics.

== Biography ==
Liu has completed her higher education all over the world. As a young woman, Liu completed her studies in Beijing and Hong Kong before she moved to Germany and earned a doctorate degree in physics at University of Stuttgart in 2009. In order to succeed, she had to overcome the culture shock between the two countries' lifestyles. A year later she became a postdoctoral fellow at the University of California, Berkeley. In 2011, she transitioned again to Rice University to be a Texas Instrument Visiting professor. The following year, Liu joined the Max-Planck Institute for Intelligent Systems and led the "Small Nanoplasmonics" research group. Since 2015, Liu moved back to Germany and is a professor at University of Stuttgart. Liu has also been married since receiving her degrees in China.

== Scientific contributions ==
Only being a PhD candidate before 2009, she published 11 papers before receiving her degree.

Through Liu's research efforts, she has become a leading scientist in optics as it pertains to DNA and catalytic chemistry. Much of the research she conducts is on the nano (less than 3 nm) level. Liu designs and studies 3D meta-materials which are classified as smaller than visible light's wavelength. These can play an important role to understand small scale biological structures and even metal interactions. In addition, she was involved in designing an absorber device for optical sensing, even through metal interference.

== Publications ==
Liu has been a prolific publisher since 2008. A few of her most cited articles as of 2020 tracked by Web of Science are:

- Liu, N., Mesch, M., Weiss, T., Hentschel, M., & Giessen, H. (2010). "Infrared Perfect Absorber and Its Application as Plasmonic Sensor" Nano Letters, 10(7), 2342–2348. doi.10.1021/NL9041033
- Liu, N., Langguth, L., Weiss, T., Kästel, J., Fleischhauer, M., Pfau, T., & Giessen, H. (2009). "Plasmonic analogue of electromagnetically induced transparency at the Drude damping limit" Nature Materials, 8(9), 758–762.doi.org/10.1021/NL9041033
- Liu, N., Mesch, M., Weiss, T., Hentschel, M., Giessen, H. (2010) "Planar Metamaterial Analogue of Electromagnetically Induced Transparency for Plasmonic Sensing" Nano Letters, 10(4),1103-1107 doi.10.1021/NL902621D
- Liu, N., Tan, M., Hentshcel, M., Giessen, H., Alivisatos, A. (2011) "Nanoantenna-enhanced gas sensing in a single tailored nanofocus" Nature Materials 10, 631–636 doi. 10.1038/NMAT3029
- Liu, N., Guo, H., Fu, L., Kaiser, S., Schweizer, H., Giessen, H. (2008) "Three-dimensional photonic metamaterials at optical frequencies" Nature Materials, 7, 31-37 doi 10.1038/NMAT2072

== Awards ==
By incorporating chemistry and biology into nano-photonics, Liu has advanced the multidisciplinary collaboration and research within this field. She has gained much recognition for her hard work within the field at such a young age. Over the years, Liu has received many awards including:

- 2023 Fellow of the American Physical Society "for seminal contributions to the development of three-dimensional optical metamaterials and leadership in paving the new research field of DNA-based 3D dynamic nanophotonics"
- 2020 Fellow of Optica
- 2019: Adolph Lomb Medal (awards a young scientist or engineer who has greatly advanced the field of optics by The Optical Society)
- 2019: Nano Letters Young Investigator Lectureship Award (awards large contribution in the field of nano-science and technology)
- 2018 & 2019: Highly Cited Researcher by the Web of Science
- 2018: Kavli Foundation Early Career Lectureship in Materials Science (awards young researchers who show great potential for leadership within their career and advances the field greatly by the Materials Research Society; winners are also given a monetary prize and the ability to present their research at the award ceremony)
- 2018: Rudolf-Kaiser Prize
- 2016: IUPAP Young Scientist Prize in Optics (awards 8 years of excellent research after completion of Ph.D; winners are also given a monetary prize, medal and ability to present their research at the award conference)
- 2015: Light 2015 Young Women in Photonics Award (given by the European Optical Society)
- 2014: Heinz Maier-Leibnitz Award (awards young researchers within the country who have had quick career advancements by the German Research Foundation and are highly encouraged to continue their hard work; winners are given a monetary prize)
- 2014: European Research Council Starting Grant
- 2013: Elisabeth Schiemann-Kolleg of the Max Planck Society Fellowship
- 2010: Hertha Sponer Prize of the German Research Foundation
