= James Stone (physicist) =

American astrophysicist

- Born: Cornwall, England
- Education: University of Illinois; Queen’s University
- Known for: ZEUS code, Athena code (magnetohydrodynamics)
- Awards: Aneesur Rahman Prize for Computational Physics (2011); Brouwer Award (Division on Dynamical Astronomy) (2018)
- Scientific career
- Workplaces: Institute for Advanced Study; Princeton University; University of Cambridge; University of Maryland
- Thesis: Numerical Simulations of Protostellar Mass Outflows (1990)
- Doctoral advisor: Dimitri Mihalas; Michael Norman
- Website: www.ias.edu/sns/jmstone

James McLellan Stone is an American astrophysicist who specialises in the study of fluid dynamics. He is currently a faculty member at the school of natural sciences at the Institute for Advanced Study. Stone is also the Lyman Spitzer Jr. Professor of Theoretical Astrophysics, emeritus, and professor of astrophysical sciences and applied and computational mathematics, emeritus, at Princeton University.

== Biography ==
He studied at Queen's University in Kingston, Ontario, where he was awarded B.Sc. in 1984 and an M.Sc. in 1986. He was awarded a Ph.D. in 1990 by the University of Illinois.

During his academic career, he held academic positions at the University of Cambridge and the University of Maryland before accepting his position at Princeton University.

At Princeton his research concentrated on the application of large-scale numerical simulations to study the gas dynamics in a range of astrophysical systems, from protostars to clusters of galaxies. These studies necessitated the development of advanced numerical algorithms which could be run on advanced computers. Together with Michael Norman, he developed the original ZEUS code to analyse astrophysical magnetohydrodynamics (MHD) and later, with other collaborators, developed Athena, a high-order Godunov scheme for astrophysical MHD that uses the recently developed technique of adaptive mesh refinement (AMR). Both these public codes are now widely used in astrophysics.

== Honors and awards ==
- 2011 Awarded the Aneesur Rahman Prize for Computational Physics
- 2013 Elected a Fellow of the American Physical Society
- 2018 Awarded the Brouwer Award (Division on Dynamical Astronomy) from the American Astronomical Society
- 2020 Elected as a member of the American Academy of Arts and Sciences in 2020.
- 2020 Elected a Legacy Fellow of the American Astronomical Society.
- 2024 James Craig Watson Medal
