= Donald H. Weingarten =

Computational physicist

- Born: February 16, 1945 (age 81); Boston, Massachusetts
- Education: Columbia University
- Awards: Aneesur Rahman Prize for Computational Physics (1997)
- Scientific career
- Fields: Mathematical physics
- Workplaces: Indiana University
- Thesis: The Optical Model, Lorentz Contraction and Proton-Proton Scattering (1970)
- Doctoral advisor: Robert Serber

Donald Henry Weingarten (born February 16, 1945) is a computational physicist.

Born in Boston, Massachusetts, he received an undergraduate degree in 1965 and a Ph.D. in 1970 from Columbia University, New York.

From 1969 to 1976 he held research positions at Fermilab (then the National Accelerator Laboratory), the University of Copenhagen, the University of Paris, and the University of Rochester. From 1976 to 1983 he was an assistant professor, associate professor, and full professor at Indiana University. In 1983 he took his present position in the Research Division of IBM in Yorktown Heights, New York.

In 1987 he was elected a Fellow of the American Physical Society "for his original theoretical contributions to particle physics, especially the introduction of Monte Carlo methods for field theories with fermions, rigorous inequalities among fermion bound state masses, and lattice formulation of string theory". In 1997 he received the Aneesur Rahman Prize for Computational Physics, their highest honor for work in computational physics.
