= Adalberto Giazotto =

Italian physicist (1940–2017)

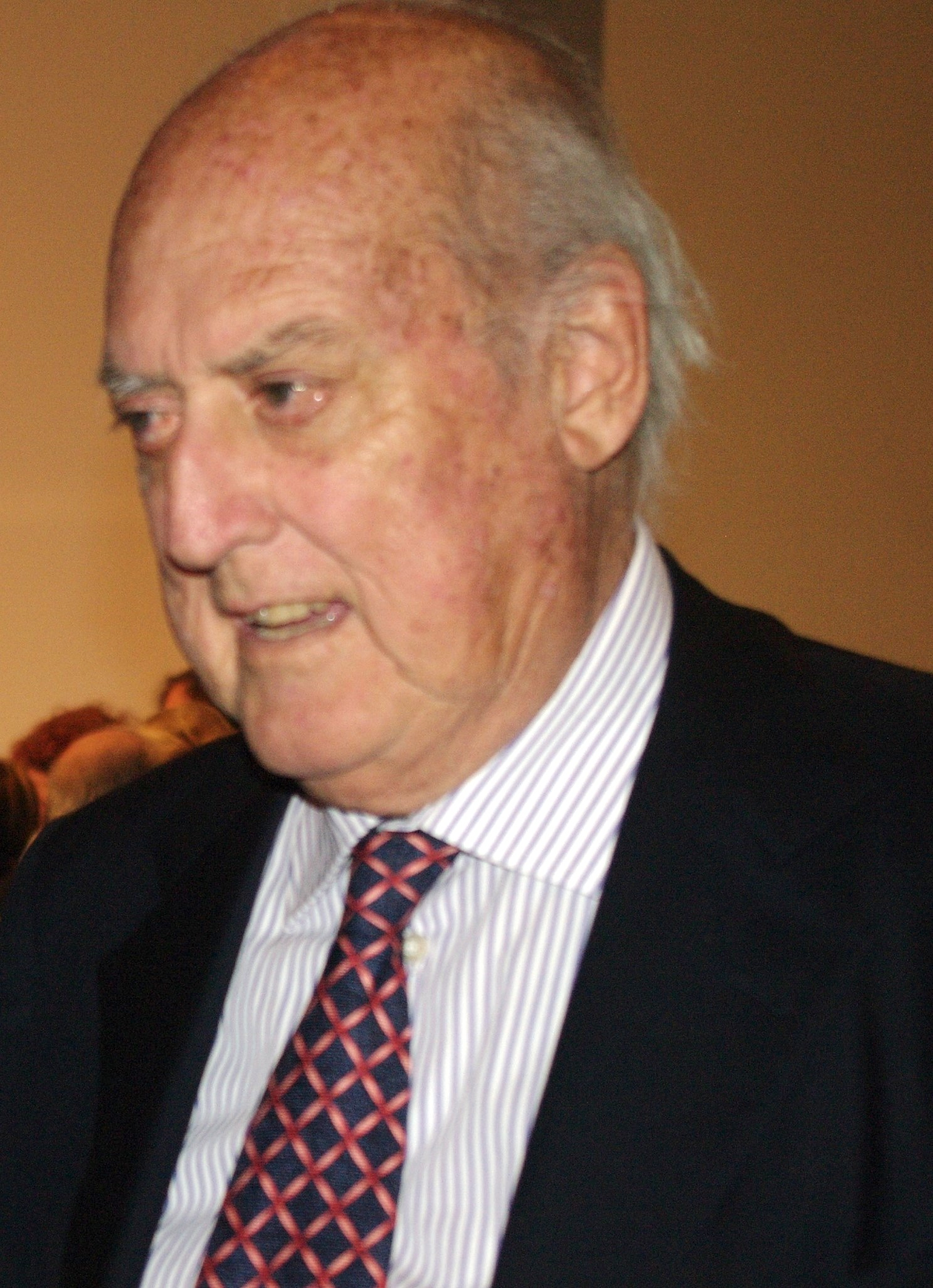
Giazotto in 2016

Adalberto Giazotto (1 February 1940 – 16 November 2017) was an Italian physicist.

Born in Genoa to musicologist Remo Giazotto, Adalberto Giazotto earned his degree in physics from the Sapienza University of Rome. He helped design the Virgo interferometer, which first detected gravitational waves in 2017. He won the Caterina Tomassoni e Felice Pietro Chisesi Prize, a Matteucci Medal, and shared the Enrico Fermi Prize with Barry Barish in 2016.
