= IBM (atoms) =

Demonstration in nanotechnology by IBM

IBM spelled out using 35 xenon atoms

IBM in atoms was a demonstration by IBM scientists in 1989 of a technology capable of manipulating individual atoms. A scanning tunneling microscope was used to arrange 35 individual xenon atoms on a substrate of chilled crystal of nickel to spell out the three letter company initialism. It was the first time that atoms had been precisely positioned on a flat surface.

== Research ==
Donald Eigler and Erhard Schweizer of the IBM Almaden Research Center in San Jose, California, discovered the ability using a scanning tunneling microscope (STM) to move atoms about the surface. In the demonstration, where the microscope was used in low temperature, they positioned 35 individual xenon atoms on a substrate of chilled crystal of nickel to form the acronym "IBM". The pattern they created was 5 nm tall and 17 nm wide. They also assembled chains of xenon atoms similar in form to molecules. The demonstrated capacity showed the potential of fabricating rudimentary structures and allowed insights as to the extent of device miniaturization.

== See also ==
- A Boy and His Atom – The world's smallest movie
- "There's Plenty of Room at the Bottom" – Famous lecture by Richard Feynman
