= Gary S. Grest =

American physicist

Gary S. Grest is an American computational physicist at Sandia National Laboratories.

He was awarded a BSc in physics (1971), an MS in physics (1973) and a PhD in physics (1974) by the Louisiana State University. His interest is the theory and simulation of nanoscale phenomena.

Since 1998 he has been a member of the technical staff of Sandia Laboratories, since 2009 an adjunct professor in department of chemistry, Clemson University and since 2013 a Distinguished Sandia National Laboratories Professor in the department of chemical and biological engineering, University of New Mexico.

He was elected a Fellow of the American Physical Society in 1989 "for contributions to the understanding of the kinetics of domain growth, amorphous glasses, disordered magnets, and polymer dynamics" He was elected to the National Academy of Engineering in 2008.

He received the Aneesur Rahman Prize for Computational Physics from the American Physical Society in 2008 for his work in computational physics and the American Physical Society Polymer Physics Prize in 2011.
