= Isabelle Staude =

German researcher and academic

Isabelle Philippa Staude
- Born: 1982 (age 43–44)
- Education: University of Konstanz; Karlsruhe Institute of Technology
- Scientific career
- Workplaces: Australian Research Council; Australian National University; Friedrich Schiller Universitaet, Jena
- Thesis: Functional elements in three-dimensional photonic bandgap materials (2011)

Isabelle Philippa Staude (born 1982), is a German photonics researcher and Professor at the Friedrich Schiller Universitaet, Jena. Her research involves the creation of plasmonic nanostructures and metamaterials for the dynamic manipulation of light.

== Early life and education ==
Staude was born in Germany. She was an undergraduate student in physics at the University of Konstanz. She moved to Karlsruhe Institute of Technology for her doctoral research, where she studied photonic band gap materials. She was a postdoctoral researcher at the Australian National University, where she started working on optical nanoantennas and plasmonic structures. She was Deputy Leader of the Australian Research Council centre CUDOS (Centre of Excellence for Center for Ultrahigh bandwidth Devices for Optical Systems).

== Research and career ==
Staude joined the Abbe Center of Photonics at the Friedrich Schiller Universitaet, Jena in 2015. Her early work considered functional photonic nanostructures, and was supported by an Emmy Noetherfellowship. She was made a professor in Photonic Nanomaterials in 2020.

Staude is interested in optically resonant dielectric metasurfaces, which can be used to manipulate the nanoscale properties of light. Metasurfaces were originally proposed as passive structures, but dieletric meta surfaces can be used for dynamic control of light, nonlinear optics and emission.

She has created tunable metadevices that can modulate transmittance electrically, which can be used to make more efficient and sustainable displays. In 2021 she started working alongside ANU on the development of holographic mobile phone displays.

== Awards and honours ==
- 2016 European Optical Society Early Career Women in Photonics
- 2017 German Physical Society Hertha Sponer Prize
- 2018 Member of the German Young Academy

== Select publications ==
- Manuel Decker; Isabelle Staude; Matthias Falkner; Jason Dominguez; Dragomir N. Neshev; Igal Brener; Thomas Pertsch; Yuri S. Kivshar (1 February 2015). "High-Efficiency Dielectric Huygens' Surfaces". Advanced Optical Materials. 3 (6): 813–820. arXiv:1405.5038. doi:10.1002/adom.201400584. ISSN 2195-1071. Wikidata Q59866777.
- Isabelle Staude; Andrey E Miroshnichenko; Manuel Decker; et al. (21 August 2013). "Tailoring directional scattering through magnetic and electric resonances in subwavelength silicon nanodisks". ACS Nano. 7 (9): 7824–7832. doi:10.1021/nn402736f. ISSN 1936-0851. PMID 23952969. Wikidata Q44589642.
- Isabelle Staude; Jörg Schilling (May 2017). "Metamaterial-inspired silicon nanophotonics". Nature Photonics. 11 (5): 274–284. doi:10.1038/nphoton.2017.39. ISSN 1749-4885. Wikidata Q62604980.
