= Kai-Ming Ho =

- Born: Hong Kong
- Education: University of Hong Kong (BS 1973); University of California, Berkeley (Ph.D. 1978)
- Scientific career
- Fields: Condensed Matter Physics
- Doctoral advisor: Marvin L. Cohen

Kai-Ming Ho is a senior physicist at Ames Laboratory and distinguished professor emeritus in the Department of Physics and Astronomy at Iowa State University.

A world-leader in the field of photonic crystals. His research interests include electronic and structural properties of crystals, surfaces, clusters, metallic liquids and glasses.

Co-developed photonic bandgap (PBG) structures, that can control light like semiconductors control electrons, with Costas Soukoulis and Che-Ting Chan in 1990. The technology made the 24th spot on a list of the 100 greatest science and technology achievements in the history of the U.S. Department of Energy since it was founded in 1977.

== Honors ==
- 2012 Aneesur Rahman Prize for Computational Physics
- 1995 Fellow of the American Physical Society
- 1992 DOE Basic Energy Sciences Outstanding Scientific Accomplishment Award
- 1996 DOE Materials Sciences Award for Sustained Outstanding Research in Solid State Physics
