= Elisabeth Fischer-Friedrich =

German biophysicist

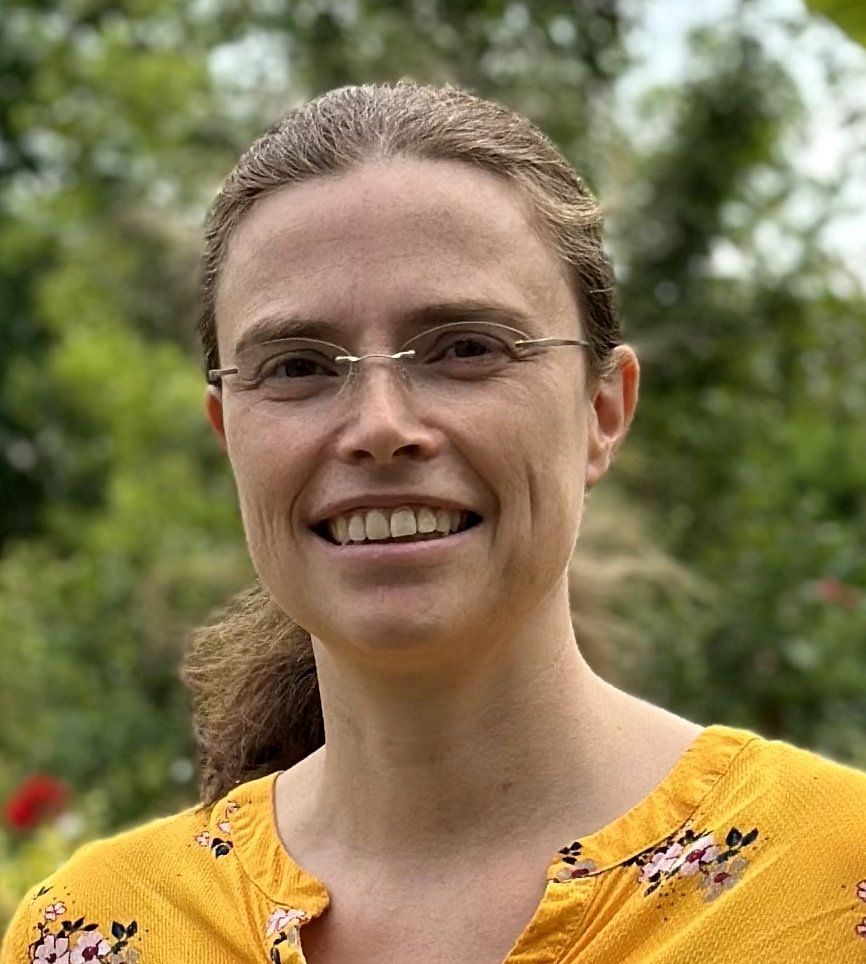
Elisabeth Fischer-Friedrich (2023)

Elisabeth Fischer-Friedrich (born 1981) is a German biophysicist. She is a researcher in the Excellence Cluster Physics of Life (PoL) at the Technischen Universität Dresden. Her scientific work has been recognized with the Otto Hahn Medal and the Hertha Sponer Prize.

== Career ==
Elisabeth Fischer-Friedrich studied physics at the University of Leipzig and the University of Edinburgh and received her doctorate from Saarland University in 2009.

After completing her PhD, she worked as a postdoc at the Weizmann Institute in Israel, the Max Planck Institute of Molecular Cell Biology and Genetics and the Max Planck Institute for the Physics of Complex Systems in Dresden. In 2017, she became a group leader at the Biotechnology Center (BIOTEC) at Technische Universität Dresden, and in 2019 she became a group leader at the Physics of Life (PoL) Cluster of Excellence at TU Dresden.

In 2023, Fischer-Friedrich was appointed Heisenberg Professor for Mechanics of Active Biomaterials at TU Dresden. She deals with the question of how mechanical stress influences the properties of cells or biological tissues, such as growth. Her focus is on the actin cytoskeleton and on the extracellular matrix. In her work, she was able to show that metastasis in carcinomas is closely linked to changes in the stiffness of cancer cells.

== Awards and honors ==
- 2009 Otto Hahn Medal of the Max-Planck-Gesellschaft
- 2022 Hertha Sponer Prize of the German Physical Society for her "outstanding contributions to the characterization of the mechanical properties of cells and protein condensates"
