= Corinna Kollath =

German physicist

Corinna Susan Kollath (born 21 April 1976) is a Scottish-born German theoretical and computational physicist whose research involves ultracold gases, the many-body problem, and out-of-equilibrium low dimensional correlated systems in quantum mechanics. She is a professor at the University of Bonn

== Education and career ==
Kollath was born on 21 April 1976 in Stirling. She studied physics at the University of Cologne, with a year at the University of Glasgow where she earned a bachelor's degree in mathematics and physics in 1998, with first-class honours. Returning to Cologne, she completed a diploma in 2001 under the supervision of Martin Zirnbauer. Next, she did doctoral research at LMU Munich with Jan von Delft and Ulrich Schollwöck, but completed her doctorate at RWTH Aachen University in 2005.

She was a postdoctoral researcher at the University of Geneva and the École polytechnique in France, in 2008 continuing at the École polytechnique as a researcher for the French National Centre for Scientific Research (CNRS). She took an associate professorship at the University of Geneva in 2011 and in 2013 moved to her present position as a full professor of theoretical quantum physics at the University of Bonn.

== Recognition ==
Kollath was the 2009 winner of the Hertha Sponer Prize of the German Physical Society for her research on ultracold gases. In 2010 the Göttingen Academy of Sciences and Humanities gave her their physics prize.

In 2020 she was named a Fellow of the American Physical Society (APS), after a nomination from the APS Division of Atomic, Molecular and Optical Physics, "for studies of low dimensional correlated systems, in particular out of equilibrium, using a combination of analytic and novel numerical approaches".
