= Remo Giazotto =

Italian composer (1910–1998)

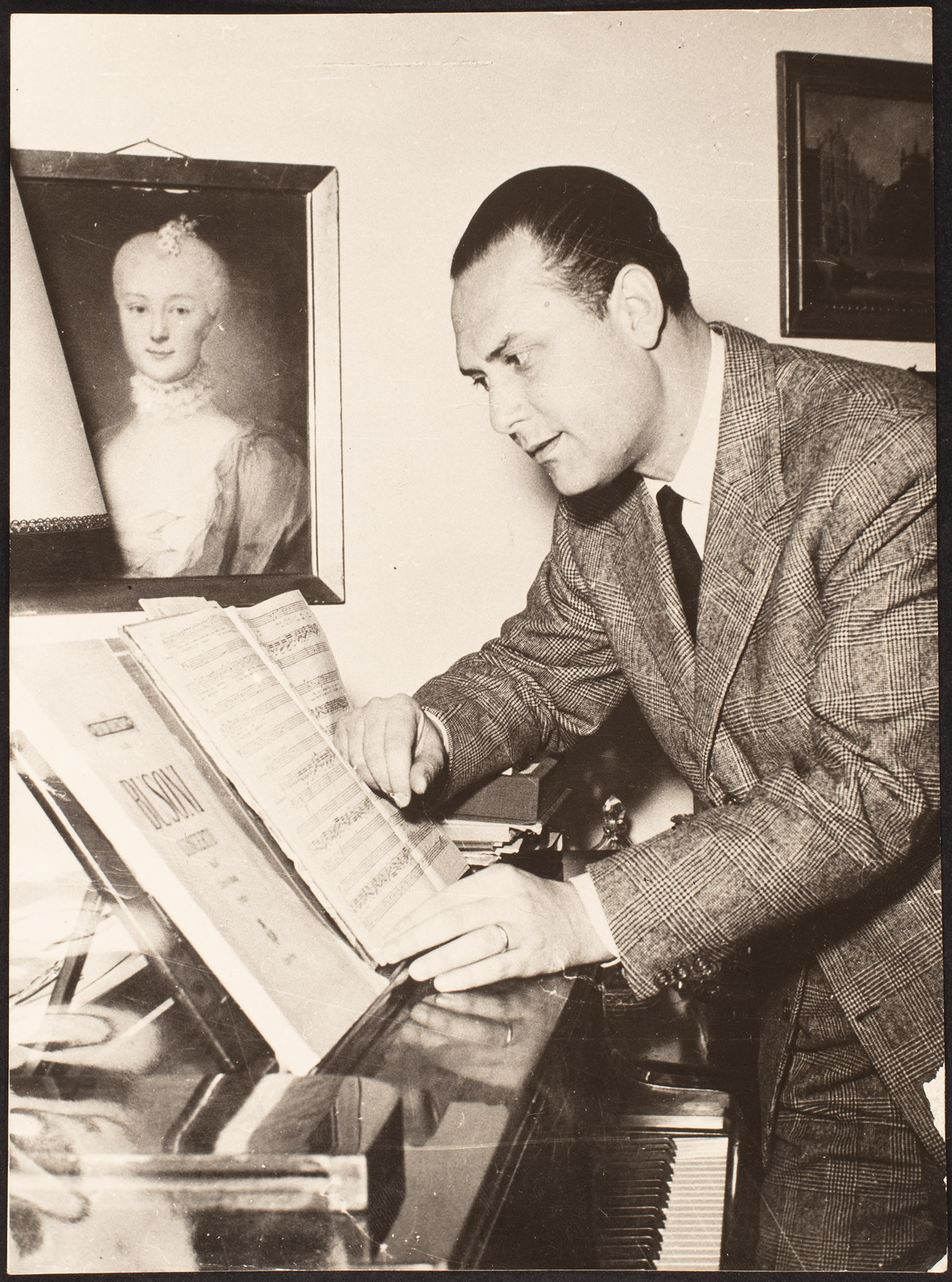

Background information
- Born: 4 September 1910; Rome
- Died: 26 August 1998 (aged 87) Pisa

Remo Giazotto (4 September 1910, Rome – 26 August 1998, Pisa) was an Italian musicologist, music critic, and composer, mostly known through his systematic catalogue of the works of Tomaso Albinoni. He wrote biographies of Albinoni and other composers, including Antonio Vivaldi.

Giazotto served as a music critic (from 1932) and editor (1945–1949) of the Rivista musicale italiana and was appointed co-editor of the Nuova rivista musicale italiana in 1967. He was a professor of the history of music at the University of Florence (1957–69) and in 1962 was nominated to the Accademia Nazionale di S. Cecilia.

In 1949, Giazotto became the director of the chamber music programs for Italian state broadcaster RAI and in 1966 was appointed director of its international programs organized through the European Broadcasting Union. He was also the president of RAI's auditioning committee and editor of its series of biographies on composers.

Giazotto was the father of physicist Adalberto Giazotto.

== Adagio in G minor ==
Giazotto is famous for his publication in 1958 of a work called Adagio in G minor, which he claimed to have elaborated from a fragment of an Albinoni trio sonata that he had received from the Saxon State Library. According to Giazotto, it contained the bass line in print and six bars from the first violin part in manuscript. However, the fragment has never appeared in public, and the work was copyrighted by Giazotto.

== Writings ==
- Il melodramma a Genova nei secoli XVII e XVIII (Genoa, 1941)
- Tomaso Albinoni, 'musico violino dilettante veneto' (1671–1750) (Milan, 1945)
- Busoni: la vita nell opera (Milan, 1947)
- La musica a Genova nella vita pubblica e privata dal XIII al XVIII secolo (Genoa, 1951)
- Poesia melodrammatica e pensiero critico nel Settecento (Milan, 1952)
- Il Patricio di Hercole Bottrigari dimostrato praticamente da un anonimo cinquecentesco, CHM, i (1953), 97–112
- Harmonici concenti in aere veneto (Rome, 1955)
- La musica italiana a Londra negli anni di Purcell (Rome, 1955)
- Annali Mozartiani (Milan, 1956)
- Giovan Battista Viotti (Milan, 1956)
- Musurgia nova (Mila, 1959)
- Vita di Alessandro Stradella (Milan, 1962)
- Vivaldi (Milan, 1965)
- "La guerra dei palchi", Nuova Rivista Musicale Italiana, i (1967), 245–86, 465–508; iii (1969), 906–33; v (1971), 1304–52
- "Nel CCC anno della morte di Antonio Cesti: ventidue lettere ritrovate nell' Archivio di Stato di Venezia", Nuova Rivista Musicale Italiana, iii (1969), 496–512

His papers can be accessed online at the "Archivio Storico Ricordi Collezione Digitale" including a photograph of Giazotto. (N.B. In numerous online resources, images of Herbert von Karajan or Peter Warlock are used inaccurately.)
