= Tomassoni awards =

Tomassoni awards was the overarching name of two prizes for outstanding achievements in physics, the Premio Felice Pietro Chisesi e Caterina Tomassoni and the Premio Caterina Tomassoni e Felice Pietro Chisesi. The two prizes were awarded every one or two years from 2001 to 2011 by the Sapienza University of Rome. The prize values were €80,000 and €40,000, respectively.

In 2013 the awards were unified into a single prize, to be known as the Caterina Tomassoni and Felice Pietro Chisesi Prize. The combined prize will be presented each year on April, at the Sapienza University of Rome with a value of Euro 50,000.

== Recipients ==
=== Before 2013 ===
Year	Award	Recipient	Institutions
2001	Chisesi–Tomassoni	Serge Haroche	Pierre and Marie Curie University - École normale supérieure (Paris)
2001	Tomassoni–Chisesi	Ignazio Ciufolini	University of Salento
2002	Unassigned	Unassigned	Unassigned
2003	Chisesi–Tomassoni	Pierre Encrenaz	Pierre and Marie Curie University - French Academy of Sciences
2003	Tomassoni–Chisesi	Lisa Randall	Harvard University
2004	Chisesi–Tomassoni	Till Kirsten	Max Planck Institute for Nuclear Physics
2004	Tomassoni–Chisesi	Federico Capasso	Harvard University
2005	Chisesi–Tomassoni	Igor Dmitriyevich Novikov	Østervold Observatory
2005	Tomassoni–Chisesi	Piero Zucchelli	Istituto Nazionale di Fisica Nucleare - CERN
2006	Chisesi–Tomassoni	Wolfgang Götze	Technical University of Munich
2006	Tomassoni–Chisesi	Savas Dimopoulos	Stanford University
2007	Unassigned	Unassigned	Unassigned
2008	Chisesi–Tomassoni	Edward Lorenz	Harvard University
2008	Tomassoni–Chisesi	Gerald Gabrielse	Harvard University
2009	Chisesi–Tomassoni	Gabriele Veneziano	CERN
2009	Tomassoni–Chisesi	Thomas Ebbesen	University of Strasbourg
2010	Chisesi–Tomassoni	Massimo Inguscio	NRC (Roma)
2010	Tomassoni–Chisesi	Alex Zunger	University of Colorado Boulder
2011	Chisesi–Tomassoni	Paul Linford Richards	University of California, Berkeley
2011	Tomassoni–Chisesi	Herbert Spohn	Technical University of Munich
2012	Unassigned	Unassigned	Unassigned

=== After 2013 ===
Year	Recipient	Institutions
2013	Alain Aspect	Institut d'optique - École polytechinque - French Academy of Sciences
2014	Igor Klebanov	Princeton University
2015	Charles L. Bennett	Johns Hopkins University
2016	Adalberto Giazotto	Istituto Nazionale di Fisica Nucleare - CERN
2017	Fabiola Gianotti	CERN
2018	Philip Kim	Harvard University
2018	Scott Aaronson	University of Texas at Austin
2019	Giulia Galli	University of Chicago
2019	Alexander Szameit	University of Rostock
2020	Jo Dunkley	Princeton University
2020	Karoline Schäffner	Max Planck Institute for Physics
2021	Michele Vendruscolo	University of Cambridge
2021	Zohar Komargodski	Simons Center for Geometry and Physics - State University of New York
2023	David B. Kaplan	University of Washington

== See also ==
- List of physics awards
