= Alex Zunger =

Research professor in theoretical physics

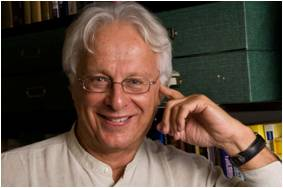
- Education: Tel Aviv University (BSc, MSc, PhD)
- Known for: Foundational first-principles theory of Electronic structure Inverse design of materials
- Awards: Boer Medal for fundamental solar energy research (2018); Hume-Rothery Award (2013); Sackler Fellow, IAS Tel Aviv University (2012); Materials Theory Award of the MRS (2011); Tomassoni award (2010); Gutenberg Award, Mainz University (2009); Bardeen Award of the TMS (2001); Rahman Award of the APS (2001); APS Fellow; MRS Fellow
- Scientific career
- Fields: Condensed matter theory of real materials
- Institutions: [Tel Aviv UniversityNational Renewable Energy Laboratory; University of Colorado Boulder
- Doctoral advisor: Prof.J.Jortner and Prof.B.Englman Tel Aviv University
- Other academic advisors: Arthur J. Freeman; Marvin L. Cohen
- Website: www.colorado.edu/rasei/alex-zunger-0 www.colorado.edu/faculty/zunger-matter-by-design/alex-zunger

Alex Zunger is a theoretical physicist, research professor, at the University of Colorado Boulder. He has authored more than 150 papers in Physical Review Letters and Physical Reviews B Rapid Communication, has an h-index over 150, number of citations over 113,000 (Google Scholar). He co-authored one of the top-five most cited papers ever to be published in the Physical Review family in its over 100 years' history.

== Work and career ==
Zunger received his B.Sc., M.Sc., and Ph.D. education at Tel Aviv University in Israel and did his post-doctoral training at Northwestern University with Arthur J. Freeman and (as an IBM Fellow) at the University of California, Berkeley, working with Marvin L. Cohen.

Zunger's research field is the condensed matter theory of real materials. He developed pseudopotentials for first-principles electronic structure calculations within the framework of density functional theory (1977), co-developed the momentum-space total-energy method with Marvin L. Cohen (1978), co-developed what is now the most widely used exchange and correlation energy functional and the self-interaction correction with John Perdew (1981), and developed a novel theoretical method for simultaneous relaxation of atomic positions and charge densities in self-consistent local-density approximation calculations (1983). In 1990, Zunger and colleagues at NREL proposed the special quasirandom structures approach to generate disordered structures of solid-state materials, which has since become a community standard. He also developed novel methods for calculating the electronic properties of semiconductor quantum nanostructures. These atomistic methods have enabled Zunger and his team to discover a range of many-body effects underlying the fundamental physics of the creation, multiplication, and annihilation of excitons.

His work has contributed greatly to the fundamental understanding of a wide range of materials phenomena in photovoltaic utilization of solar energy materials. The foundational methods he developed in the quantum theory of solids now form an essential integral part of the worldwide activities in the broad field of first-principles calculations of solid-state materials.

In recent years, Zunger has focused on developing methods for solving the inverse band structure problem, which was first proposed in 1999 by Franceschetti and Zunger in a publication in the journal Nature. Their proposed approach involves the use of ideas from quantum mechanics as well as genetic algorithms to search for atomic configurations that have a desired target property. Zunger advocates the goal to study real materials rather than their idealized version to achieve realistic prediction outcomes by computational methods, this would require proper theoretical account of disorder, doping, defects, etc. This has been the direction throughout his and colleagues' works on the doping effects in quantum materials and polymorphism in photovoltaic materials.

== Organizations and honors ==
In 1978, Zunger established NREL's Solid-State Theory Group, which he headed until 2011. He has been an NREL Research Fellow, is a Fellow of the American Physical Society, and was the first director of the DOE Basic Energy Sciences "Center for Inverse Design". He has also trained 77 post-doctoral fellows. He is the recipient of the inaugural 2011 Materials Theory Award of the Materials Research Society (On the Inverse Band Structure method ), the Hume-Rothery Award of the TMS (on the foundational theory of alloys); the 2010 Tomassoni Prize and Science Medal of the Scola Physica Romana (for Density Functional advances), the 2009 Gutenberg Research Award from Johannes Gutenberg University (on highly correlated physics); the 2001 John Bardeen Prize from TMS (on spontaneous ordering in semiconductor alloys), and the 2001 Rahman Award of the American Physical Society (on the foundations of first-principles pseudopotentials, the total energy in momentum space and the LDA exchange-correlation functional). In 2011, he moved from NREL to the University of Colorado where he is working in the Renewable and Sustainable Energy Institute (RASEI).

== Publications ==
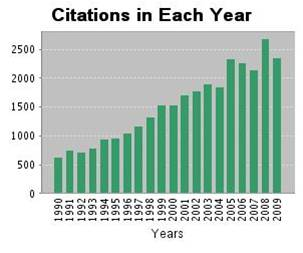
Number of citations of Zunger by year

The impact of Zunger's work is partially reflected by the very high number of citations his papers have received (over 113,000, according to the ISI Web of Science) and by his high "h-index" of 150 (i.e., 150 of his papers have been cited each at least 150 times). He is the author of the fifth-most-cited paper in the 110-year history of Physical Review (out of over 350,000 articles published in that journal). The chart shows the number of citations to articles published by Zunger for each of the last 20 years.
