= Junior professorship =

The junior professorship is an academic rank at universities and research institutions in Germany. In 2002, this position was introduced with the fifth novella of the Framework Act for Higher Education to enable young scientists and academics with an outstanding doctorate to do independent research and to teach at universities before having completed their habilitation (equivalent to postdoc). Furthermore, this position is meant to provide the qualification for a lifetime professorship.

== Description ==
=== Tasks ===
Tasks of junior professors at universities do not differ considerably from those of other professors. They mainly consist of independent university research and teaching according to Humboldt's educational ideal. The junior professorship is a limited qualification position with lower income, fewer equipment and less teaching obligations. The latter are set by the state regulations and usually consist of a total of four to five semester hours per week for junior professors, compared to other professors who have a total of eight to nine.

=== Recruitment process ===
An outstanding doctorate is usually the hiring requirement. Overall, the employment before the doctorate and as a postdoctoral researcher should not take longer than six years (in medicine nine years). Those regulations can change depending on the state. While the respective professorship decides on the occupation of their habilitation positions and can leave out job postings, the decision to occupy junior professors is made by an appointment committee. The reason for this is to increase transparency and clarity of the criteria for the decision making.

== Historical development ==
=== Origin and goals ===
Between 1969 and 1974, several states in Germany already introduced the assistant professorship (Assistenzprofessur). This dates back to the demands of the conference of federal assistants (Bundesassistentenkonferenz) and the Concept for Higher Education from Kreuznach (Kreuznacher Hochschulkonzept), which pursued similar goals as the junior professorship. However, the assistant professorship was abolished by the first Framework Act for Higher Education from 1976, as a result of reservations from professors and criticism on the side of future job candidates (the mid-level academic positions "akademischer Mittelbau"). They criticized the fixed-term contract and the lack of prospect of gaining a civil servant status. During the preparation period of the junior professorship, other expressions were also used interchangeably such as: "Assistenzprofessur", "Qualifikationsprofessur" and "Nachwuchsprofessur". Switzerland and Austria already introduced the assistant professorship some years before 2002. The assistant professorship in Switzerland is only partly comparable to the junior professorship. For example, to become an assistant professor at the University of Zürich one has to possess a doctoral degree or an equivalent. In 2002, the Austrian assistant professorship was replaced by the contract professorship (Vertragsprofessur). In 2009, the assistant professorship was simultaneously reintroduced to the contract professorship.

The Federal Ministry of Education and Research (Bundesministerium für Bildung und Forschung) deployed an expert commission "reform of the university service law" (Reform des Hochschuldienstrechts) according to the recommendations of the conference of university heads (Hochschulrektorenkonferenz) from 11 December 1998. This commission propounded its statement "Hochschuldienstrecht für das 21. Jahrhundert"(University service law for the 21st century) on 10 April 2000. This statement proposed to redesign the way of obtaining a qualification for university professors and the omission of the habilitation. Other core goals in this proposal were earlier autonomy for trainees in the areas of education and research, improvement of international connectivity, lower first job age, increase of female and foreign academics and scientists, as well as an improvement in predictability of the scientific career path.

The Federal Ministry of Education and Research was legally forced to take action based on the observation that the first job age of German professors was on average over 40 years and therefore much higher than the average of most comparable nations. The root cause seemed to be the six-year long habilitation period with a final examination in German universities. Additional pressure resulted through the migration of outstanding young academics into other countries, particularly the US. This process is called human capital flight and occurred not least of all because many people try to avoid the perennial hurdle of the habilitation process in Germany and the generally more unbureaucratic conditions in other countries. The junior professorship was also designed to solve the latter problem.

== See also ==
- Academic ranks in Germany
