= Don Eigler =

American physicist (born 1953)

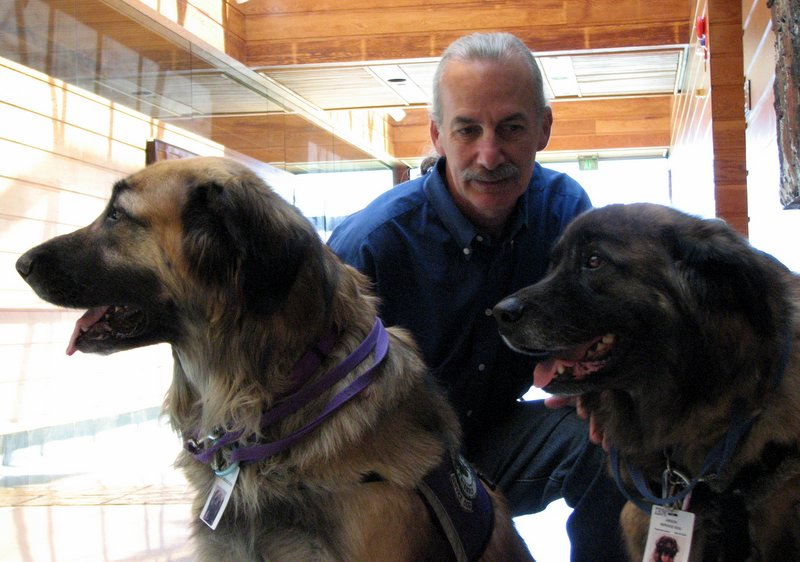
- Eigler in 2007
- Born: Donald Mark Eigler; March 23, 1953 (age 73); Los Angeles, California, U.S.
- Education: University of California San Diego
- Scientific career
- Fields: Nanotechnology
- Workplaces: IBM Almaden Research Center

Donald Mark Eigler (March 23, 1953) is an American physicist associated with nanotechnology at the IBM Almaden Research Center. He is considered an eminent nanotechnologist.

== Work ==
In 1989, Eigler was the first to use a scanning tunneling microscope tip to arrange individual atoms on a surface, spelling out the letters "IBM" with 35 xenon atoms. He later went on to create the first quantum corrals, which are well-defined quantum wave patterns of small numbers of atoms, and nanoscale logic circuits using individual molecules of carbon monoxide. He shared the 2010 Kavli Prize in Nanoscience with Nadrian Seeman for these breakthroughs.

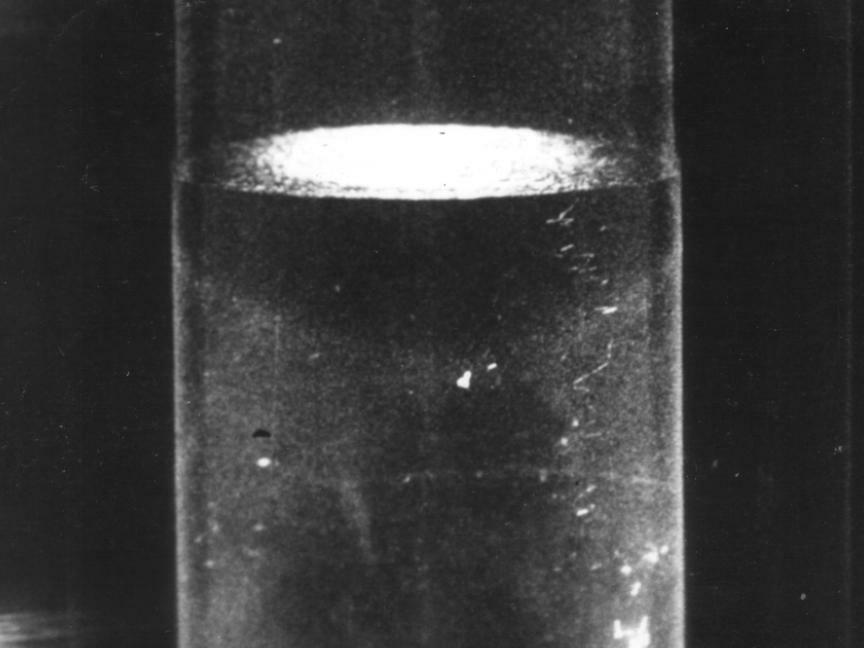
“IBM scientist on a power trip here. I'm going to move an atom.” -Don Eigler, 1996

Eigler's 1989 research, along with Erhard K. Schweizer, involved a new use of the scanning tunneling microscope, which had been invented in the mid 1980s by Gerd Binnig and Heinrich Rohrer, also of IBM. The microscope had previously been used for atomic-resolution imaging, but this was the first time it had been used as an active technique, to precisely position individual atoms on a surface. The technique requires vacuum conditions and ultra-cold temperatures achieved by liquid helium cooling, and was featured on the cover of the journal Nature. At the time, it was seen as a potential first step towards applications in mechanosynthesis, where chemical reactions could be manipulated one molecule at a time. Eigler's 2002 research, along with Andreas J. Heinrich, used a cascade of collisions of carbon monoxide molecules to perform logic operations.

Eigler graduated from the University of California, San Diego with a bachelor's degree in 1975 and a doctoral degree in 1984. He was postdoctoral staff at AT&T Bell Labs for two years, and then moved to IBM where he was appointed IBM Fellow in 1993. He retired from IBM in 2011.

He was elected in 1995 a Fellow of the American Physical Society and in 1999 a Fellow of the American Association for the Advancement of Science.
