= Uta Fritze-von Alvensleben =

German astrophysicist

- Born: 1955 (age 70–71); Munich, West Germany
- Scientific career
- Fields: Astrophysics; Astronomy
- Workplaces: University of Göttingen; University of Hertfordshire

Uta Fritze-von Alvensleben is a German astrophysicist awarded the German Physical Society's Hertha-Sponer prize in 2003 for her work on the evolution of galaxies.

== Career ==
Fritze-von Alvensleben was born in Munich and studied physics and philosophy at the Georg-August University in Göttingen. During her studies there, she visited the Grenoble Alps University in France, and at CERN in Geneva, Switzerland. She then completed her studies at the University of Göttingen in 1982 with a diploma. She finished her PhD in 1989 in astrophysics with studies about comparing spectrophotometric models of nearby galaxies with experimental redshift survey results. In January 2001 she habilitated at the University of Göttingen with a study on the evolution of galaxies on cosmological time scales at the Göttingen Observatory.

In 2005, she became a member of the Observing Program Committee for the European Southern Observatory (ESO). She was jointly responsible for assigning telescope time to different scientists for each of the eight large ESO telescopes in Chile.

After this, she researched and taught at the University of Hertfordshire as part of GALEV (Galaxy Evolution Group) at the Center for Astrophysics Research.

Fritze-von Alvensleben has been working at the University of Göttingen since 2008 where she has worked on the Göttingen Evolutionary Synthesis Code for the unified spectral, chemical and cosmological evolution of galaxies.

She was awarded the Hertha-Sponer prize in 2003 from the German Physical Society for her investigations into the spectral and chemical evolution of galaxies on cosmological time scales, particularly under the influence of interactions. The award ceremony took place during the 67th Physics Conference in March 2003 in Hanover, Germany.

She remains a member of the International Astronomical Union and has been a member of the group's Division J Galaxies and Cosmology.

== Selected publications ==
- Contardo, Gertrud, Matthias Steinmetz, and Uta Fritze-von Alvensleben. "Photometric evolution of galaxies in cosmological scenarios." The Astrophysical Journal 507, no. 2 (1998): 497.
- Alloin, Danielle, Carme Gallart, Emmanuel Fleurence, Emanuela Pompei, Daniel Raimann, Uta Fritze-Von Alvensleben, and Sukyoung Yi. "Deriving star formation histories: Evolutionary or population synthesis codes versus color-magnitude diagrams." Astrophysics and space science 281 (2002): 109-113.
- Weilbacher, Peter M., Uta Fritze-von Alvensleben, and P-A. Duc. "Optical and NIR investigation of a sample of tidal dwarf candidates." Astrophysics and space science 284 (2003): 639-642.
- Bicker, Jens, Uta Fritze-von Alvensleben, and K. J. Fricke. "Evolutionary synthesis models for galaxy transformation in clusters." Astrophysics and space science 284, no. 2 (2003): 463-466.
