= Roberto Car =

Italian physicist (born 1947)

- Born: January 3, 1947 (age 79); Trieste, Italy
- Education: Politecnico di Milano
- Known for: Car–Parrinello method
- Scientific career
- Workplaces: EPFL; IBM; SISSA; University of Geneva; Princeton University
- Doctoral advisor: Orazio Svelto

Roberto Car (born 3 January 1947 in Trieste) is an Italian physicist and the Ralph W. Dornte *31 Professor in Chemistry at Princeton University, where he is also a faculty member in the Princeton Institute for the Science and Technology of Materials. He researches the simulation of molecular dynamics phenomena.

== Life ==
Car studied physics and attained a doctorate in 1971 in nuclear technology at the Politecnico di Milano. He was a postdoc at the University of Milan from 1973 to 1974, an assistant at the École Polytechnique Fédérale de Lausanne (EPFL) from 1977 to 1981, employed at the Thomas J. Watson Research Center of IBM from 1981 to 1983, associate professor for physics at SISSA in Trieste (in 1990/91 as full professor) from 1984 to 1990, and professor for physics at the University of Geneva (and director of the IRRMA of EPFL) from 1991 to 1999.

He is a professor in the Theory Department of the Fritz Haber Institute of the Max Planck Society.

He is a member of the Italian Scientists and Scholars in North America Foundation.

== Awards ==
In 2009 he shared the Dirac Medal with Michele Parrinello for their development of the ab initio molecular dynamics simulation method. The method combines the quantum mechanical density functional theory for calculation of electronic structure with methods of molecular dynamics for the simulation of classical ("Newtonian") atomic movements. They call their procedure ab initio molecular dynamics ; it is also well known as the Car–Parrinello method. The procedure was jointly developed by both men in 1985, while working at SISSA in Trieste. Their procedure has found various applications in solid-state physics, biochemistry, chemical physics, and materials science.

In 1990 he received the Hewlett-Packard prize of the European Physical Society, in 1995 the Rahman Prize of the American Physical Society, where he is a Fellow, and in 2009 with Parinello the Sidney Fernbach Award of the IEEE. In 2008, he received the Humboldt Foundation Research Award for senior US scientists. In 2007, a birthday symposium was held at ICTP. He received the Aneesur Rahman prize in computational physics. The Aneesur Rahman Prize is the highest honor given by the American Physical Society for work in computational physics. In 2020 he was awarded the Benjamin Franklin Medal (Franklin Institute) in Chemistry.

In 2016 he was elected to the National Academy of Sciences. In the same year he was awarded the American Chemical Society's Award in Theoretical Chemistry.

== See also ==
- Wolf-Dieter Schneider
- Uzi Landman
- Eberhard Umbach
- Andreas J. Heinrich
- Ulrike Diebold
