= Eberhard Umbach =

German physicist

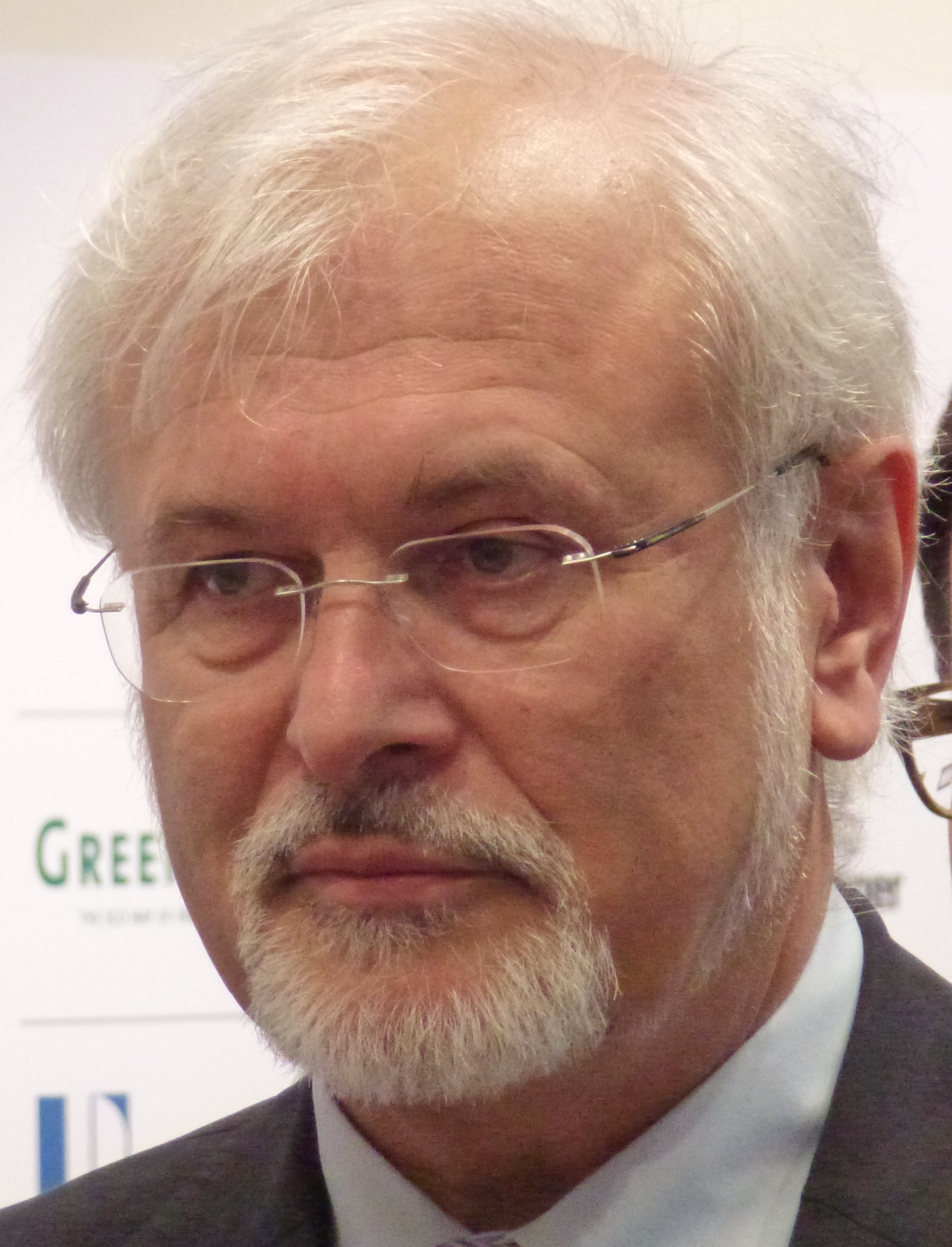
Eberhard Umbach 2012

Eberhard Umbach (born 1948 in Bad Lauterberg) is a German physicist.

== Career ==
He studied physics at the Technical University of Munich and received his doctorate in 1980 with honors. After conducting research in the United States he returned to habilitate at the Technical University of Munich in 1986.

Umbach was professor at the University of Stuttgart from 1987 to 1993 and professor at the University of Würzburg from 1993 to 2007.

From 2006-2008 he was president of the German Physical Society. From May 2007 until September 2009 he was chairman of the Karlsruhe Research Center. From 1 October 2009, Eberhard Umbach served jointly with Horst Hippler as one of the two presidents of the Karlsruhe Institute of Technology, until becoming sole president in 2012 after Hippler left to become president of the German Rectors' Conference.

== See also ==
- Wolf-Dieter Schneider
- Roberto Car
- Uzi Landman
- Andreas J. Heinrich
- Ulrike Diebold
