= Sauro Succi =

Sauro Succi is an Italian scientist, internationally credited for being one of the founders of the Lattice Boltzmann method for fluid dynamics and soft matter.

== Life and career ==
Succi was born in Forlì. In 1979 he obtained a degree in nuclear engineering at the University of Bologna, from 1981 to 1982 he was Euratom fellow at the Max Plack Institute for plasma physics in Garching, and in 1987 a PhD in physics from the Ecole Polytechnique Federale de Lausanne. From 1986 to 1995 he worked as a research scientist at the IBM European Center for Scientific and Engineering Computing in Rome.

From 1995 to 2018, Succi has been research director at the Istituto Applicazioni Calcolo of the National Research Council (CNR) in Rome. Since 2018, he has been appointed principal investigator of the research line Mesoscale Simulations at the Italian Institute of Technology (IIT).

He is also a research affiliate to the Physics Department at Harvard University (since 2000), Fellow of the Freiburg Institute for Advanced Studies (FRIAS) and senior fellow of the Erwin Schrödinger International Institute for Mathematical Physics.

He has published extensively in plasma physics, fluid dynamics, kinetic theory, quantum fluids and soft matter.

Succi has been holding visiting/teaching appointments at many academic Institutions, such as the University of Harvard, Paris VI, University of Chicago, Yale, Tufts, Queen Mary London, Scuola Normale Superiore di Pisa and the Swiss Polytechnic of Zürich (ETHZ).

From 2014 to 2019 he has been a Visiting Faculty at the IACS (Institute of Applied Computational Science of Harvard University), where he taught Computational Methods for the Physical Sciences (AM227).

== Honors and awards ==
Succi is an elected Fellow of the American Physical Society (1998). He has received the Humboldt Prize in physics (2002), the Killam Award bestowed by the University of Calgary (2005) and the Raman Chair of the Indian Academy of Sciences (2011), he is co-recipient of the Honorable Mention award of the 2011 Gordon Bell Prize and the Sigillum Magnum of the University of Bologna (2018). He also served as an external senior fellow at the Freiburg Institute for Advanced Studies (2009–2013), senior fellow of the Erwin Schrödinger International Institute for Mathematical Physics in Vienna (2013) and Weston Chair at the Weizmann Institute of Science in Rehovot (2016) and External Faculty Member of the Institute for Advanced Studies of Amsterdam (2017), Visiting Scientist at the IHES Paris (2024). In 2022 he has been appointed Honorary Professor at University College London. Associate Member of the Higgs Center for Theoretical Physics, University of Edinburgh (2025-2028).

Succi is an elected member of the Academia Europaea (2015), and he features in the list of Top Italian Scientists.

He has been awarded the 2017 APS Aneesur Rahman Prize for Computational Physics.

In 2017 he has been awarded the ERC Advanced Grant "Computational design of porous mesoscale materials (COPMAT)" and in 2024 the ERC-Proof-of-Concept grant LBFAST (Lattice Boltzmann For Advanced SimulaTions).

In 2019 he was awarded the Berni J. Alder CECAM Prize for "having transformed the Lattice-Boltzmann method into an overarching framework for kinetic physical phenomena. In addition, he has been pivotal in building and constantly inspiring a community now counting tens of thousands of researchers in academia and industry, all across chemistry and physics, and reaching into more distant fields such as engineering or biology".

He is the co-recipient of the Premio Aspen Institute Italia 2024 for excellent collaboration between Italy and the USA and the recipient of the 2023 Eugenio Beltrami Senior Scientist Prize for the Mathematics and Mechanics of Complex Systems. 2025 he received Visioni Prize for Science and Research, Confindustria Romagna.

== Selected publications ==
- The lattice Boltzmann Equation for fluid dynamics and beyond. Clarendon Press. 2001. ISBN 9780198503989.
- The Lattice Boltzmann Equation for complex States of Flowing Matter. Oxford University Press. 2018. ISBN 9780199592357.
- Sailing the Ocean of Complexity: lessons from the physics-biology frontier. Oxford University Press. 2022. ISBN 9780192897893.
