= Ulrike Diebold =

Austrian physicist (born 1961)

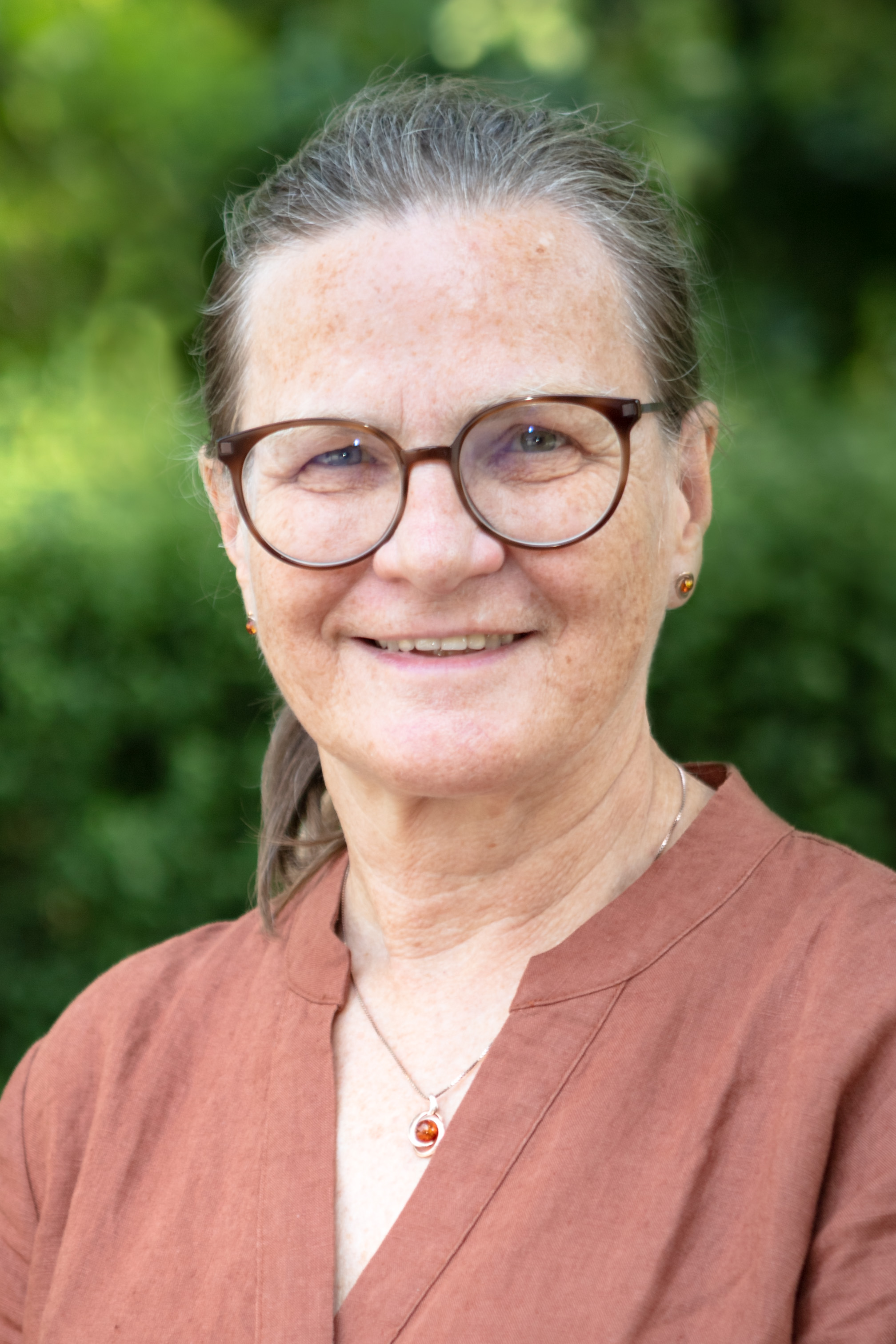
- Born: 12 December 1961; Kapfenberg, Austria
- Citizenship: Austria, United States
- Education: TU Wien
- Known for: Research on the atomic scale geometry and electronic structure of metal oxide surfaces
- Awards: 2013 Wittgenstein Award; 2014 Austrian Academy of Sciences
- Scientific career
- Fields: Physics, Chemistry, Surface Science, Materials Science
- Workplaces: TU Wien; Tulane University; Rutgers University; Austrian Academy of Sciences
- Doctoral advisor: Peter Varga
- Other academic advisors: Theodore E. Madey
- Website: www.tuwien.at/en/phy/iap/surface-physics/team/ulrike-diebold

Ulrike Diebold (born 12 December 1961, in Kapfenberg, Austria) is an Austrian physicist and materials scientist who is a professor of surface science at TU Vienna. She is known for her groundbreaking research on the atomic scale geometry and electronic structure of metal-oxide surfaces.

== Early life and education ==
Diebold was born on 12 December 1961 in Kapfenberg, Austria. She spent much of her high school years reading, skiing, and agonizing over what to major in at the university. She ultimately settled on engineering physics, an area with good job prospects that was also general enough to accommodate a variety of future directions. After completing her diploma in engineering physics (TU Vienna, 1986), she became increasingly enthusiastic about experimental physics while working on her master's thesis, and ultimately completed a Doctor of Technology (Dr. techn.) in this area with Prof. Peter Varga (TU Vienna, 1990).

== Career ==
Diebold's first appointment after graduation was as a post-doctoral research associate in the group of Theodore E. Madey in the department of physics at Rutgers University (1990–1993). It was there that she was first introduced to oxide surfaces, an area that she would later come to refer to as "the love of her scientific life". Her first faculty appointment followed, at Tulane University, New Orleans, USA, where she was an assistant professor (1993–1999), associate professor (1999–2001), and professor of physics (2001–2009), and also an adjunct professor of chemistry (1993–2009). During this time period, she also completed her habilitation in experimental physics (TU Vienna, 1998), held the Yahoo! Founder Chair in Science and Engineering (2006–2009), and was the associate department chair (2002–2009). In 2005, Diebold and her group were forced to temporarily evacuate from New Orleans, which experienced massive flooding and power outages from the impact of Hurricane Katrina. They were hosted by the group of Theodore E. Madey at Rutgers University during this challenging period. In 2010 she moved to the Institute of Applied Physics at TU Wien where she is currently a professor of surface science and deputy department head, and retains the title of research professor at Tulane University. Since 2022 she also serves as Vice President of the Austrian Academy of Sciences.

== Research ==
Ulrike Diebold is well known for her influential work in the fields of surface science, materials and physical chemistry, and condensed matter physics. In particular, she has contributed greatly to the understanding of atomic-scale surface structure and electronic surface structure of metal oxides. For her work, she mainly employs ultra-high vacuum technology and scanning tunneling microscopy.

== Awards and honors ==
In 2013, Diebold was the sole recipient of Austria's highest research award across all disciplines, the Wittgenstein Award. The award, which comes with substantial unrestricted research funds, is bestowed in support of the notion that scientists should be guaranteed the greatest possible freedom and flexibility in the performance of their research. It enabled Diebold's research activities to flourish without restriction. Other honors include:

- 2004 Fellow, American Physical Society, "For groundbreaking research on the role of defects in the interplay between bulk and surface properties of transition-metal oxides and on STM imaging of their surface structure.",
- 2005 Fellow of the American Vacuum Society
- 2007 Fellow, American Association for the Advancement of Science
- 2011, 2019 Advanced Grants by the European Research Council, for work on "Microscopic Processes and Phenomena at Oxide Surfaces and Interfaces" (2011), and "Water at Oxide Surfaces: a Fundamental Approach" (2019).
- 2013 Arthur W. Anderson Award of the American Chemical Society, for Distinguished Service in the Advancement of Surface Chemistry.
- 2013 Wittgenstein Award
- 2014 European Academy of Sciences
- 2014 Elected as a Full Member of the Austrian Academy of Sciences.
- 2015 Blaise Pascal medal in Materials Sciences by the European Academy of Sciences, for "Surfaces of Metal Oxides, Studied at the Atomic Scale".
- 2015 Debye Lecturer at Utrecht University, The Netherlands, entitled "Surface Science Studies of an Iron Oxide Model Catalyst" .
- 2015 21st Annual Schrödinger Lecturer at Trinity College Dublin, Ireland, with the title "An Atomic-Scale View at Oxide Surfaces".
- 2015 R. Brdička memorial lecturer at the J. Heyrovský Institute of Physical Chemistry, Prague, entitled "Surface Science of Metal Oxides".
- 2015 Elected to the Leopoldina, the national academy of sciences in Germany,
- 2019 Science award of the city of Vienna.
- 2020 Gerhard Ertl Lecture Award
- 2021 International Honorary Member of the American Academy of Arts and Sciences
- 2022 Fellow of the Royal Society of Chemistry

== Editorial activities ==
Diebold has served in a number of editorial roles and on a number of advisory boards for scientific journals. These include:

- 2003–present Surface Science Reports advisory editorial board
- 2006 – 2007 Journal of Physics: Condensed Matter Surface, Interface and Atomic-Scale Science editorial board
- 2006 – 2007 Chemical Physics, guest editor of special issue "Doping and Functionalization of Photoactive Semiconducting Metal Oxides" with C. Di Valentin and A. Selloni
- 2007 – 2010 Open Journal of Physical Chemistry, advisory editorial board
- 2009 - 2009 Journal of Physics: Condensed Matter "guest editor of special issue on Non-thermal Processes on Surfaces, dedicated to the memory of Theodore E Madey and perspectives on surface science" with Thomas M. Orlando
- 2016–present npj Quantum Materials, advisory editorial board member
- 2017 – 2019 ACS Energy Letters, editorial advisory board
- 2019 – 2021 Physical Review Research, editorial board
- 2020 – 2021 Science, board of reviewing editors

== Personal life ==
Diebold holds dual citizenship of both Austria and the US. She is married to Gerhard Piringer with whom she has two sons, Thomas (born 1996) and Niklas (born 1999).

== See also ==
- Wolf-Dieter Schneider
- Roberto Car
- Uzi Landman
- Eberhard Umbach
- Andreas J. Heinrich
