= Alex Zettl =

American nano-scale physicist

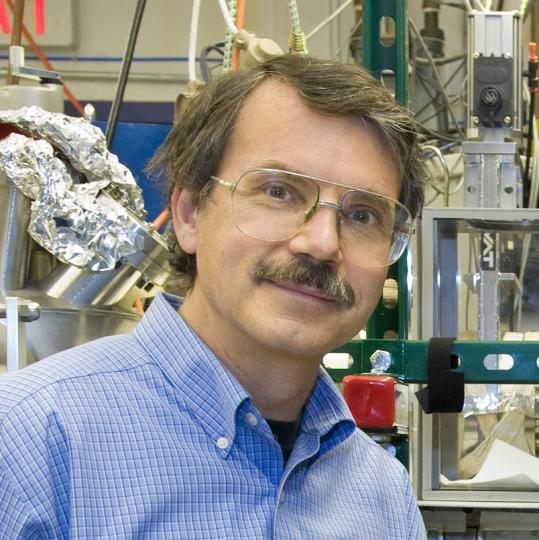
- Education: B.A. University of California, Berkeley, Ph.D. University of California, Los Angeles
- Known for: Nanoscale constructs
- Scientific career
- Workplaces: Lawrence Berkeley National Laboratory, University of California, Berkeley

Alex K. Zettl (born Oct. 11, 1956) is an American experimental physicist, educator, and inventor.

He is a professor of the Graduate School in Physics at the University of California, Berkeley, and a Senior Scientist at the Lawrence Berkeley National Laboratory. Zettl is a leading expert in the synthesis, characterization, and application of low dimensional materials. He has synthesized and studied new materials, notably those based on carbon, boron and nitrogen, and has made numerous inventions in the field of electronic materials and nano-electromechanical systems. Zettl and his research team were the first to synthesize boron nitride nanotubes, and created carbon nanotube chemical sensors. He and his team built the world's smallest synthetic electrically powered rotational nanomotor, the smallest fully integrated FM radio receiver, a nanomechanical mass balance with single-atom sensitivity, voltage-controllable nanoscale relaxation oscillators, and a nanoscale thermal rectifier useful for phononic circuitry He and his team invented the nanomanipulator, suspended graphene grid, and the graphene liquid cell and graphene flow cell, all of which have greatly advanced transmission electron microscopy.

== Early life and education ==
Zettl was born in San Francisco, California. He attended Sir Francis Drake High School (now Archie Williams High School), the University of California, Berkeley (A.B. 1978) and the University of California, Los Angeles (M.S. 1980, Ph.D. 1983). His doctoral field of study was experimental condensed matter physics. His Ph.D. advisor was Prof. George Grüner.

== Career ==
As a graduate student, Zettl closely collaborated with two-time Physics Nobel Laureate John Bardeen. Bardeen had developed a new theory of macroscopic quantum tunneling of charge density waves, and Zettl performed experiments to test the theory. After completing his Ph.D., Zettl immediately assumed a faculty position in the Physics Department at the University of California, Berkeley, and has remained there throughout his academic career (Assistant Professor, 1983–86; Associate Professor, 1986–1988; Professor, 1988–2022; Professor of the Graduate School in Physics, 2022–present).

At the Lawrence Berkeley National Laboratory Zettl led the superconductivity program from 1990 to 2002, and the sp2-bonded materials program from 1997 to 2022. From 2004 to 2014 he directed the National Science Foundation funded Center of Integrated Nanomechanical Systems. The Center brought together approximately 25 research teams from four institutions (UC Berkeley, Stanford University, California Institute of Technology, and UC Merced) and fostered highly interdisciplinary nanoelectromechanical research. The center also developed numerous educational outreach programs. From 2013 to 2015 Zettl was co-director (along with Carolyn Bertozzi), and from 2015 to 2022 Director, of the Berkeley Nanosciences and Nanoengineering Institute (BNNI), an umbrella organization for expanding and coordinating Berkeley research and educational activities in nanoscale science and engineering.

Zettl has advised approximately 50 graduate students (including those earning Ph.D. degrees in chemistry, mechanical engineering, electrical engineering, and materials science), and approximately 40 postdoctoral researchers.

== Selected research accomplishments ==
Access to Zettl's 600+ research publications, supplementary materials, and research highlights can be found at https://www.ocf.berkeley.edu/~jode/index.html.

Charge density wave statics and nonlinear dynamics

Zettl discovered chaotic response and period doubling routes to chaos in dynamic charge density wave (CDW) systems driven by an rf field, and found that mode locking completely freezes out all internal fluctuations of the collective mode condensate. He identified phase slip centers as the origin of so-called switching in CDWs. He discovered unusual electro-elastic coupling in CDW systems, and studied the evolution of the CDW order parameter as sample sizes approached the nm scale. For the 2D static CDW system TaS_{2}, Zettl used cryogenic STM measurements to fully characterize domain structure, and to contrast bulk CDW parameters determined via x-ray scattering to surface CDW parameters established by STM.

High temperature superconductors and fullerenes

Zettl performed seminal isotope effect measurements in high temperature superconductors, including substituting oxygen, barium, and copper isotopes in Y-Ba-Cu-O, substituting oxygen isotopes in La-Sr-Cu-O, and substituting carbon and alkali isotopes in A_{3}C_{60}. These measurements placed severe constraints on the superconductivity mechanism, and revealed that superconductivity in the copper oxides was likely not phonon-mediated, but likely was phonon mediated in the fullerenes. Zettl was the first to intercalate high-T_{c} superconductors with foreign molecules which allowed Cu-O planes to be physically and electronically separated. Zettl also produced high quality single crystals of fullerene superconductors which facilitated a host of detailed transport and thermodynamic measurements. Zettl revealed the elastic properties of high-T_{c} materials, and determined the effective dimensionality of fullerene superconductors via paraconductivity measurements.

Carbon and boron nitride nanotubes and related nanostructures

Zettl has performed extensive studies on the mechanical and electronic properties of carbon nanotubes (CNTs). He created electronic devices from CNTs, including a rectifier and chemical sensor. From thermal conductivity measurements he extracted the linear-T behavior expected from the quantum of thermal conductance. He created a highly robust CNT-based electron field emission source. Zettl discovered that CNTs could be stable in a fully collapsed state, which led to a refined quantification of the interlayer interaction energy in graphite; this important parameter had previously been surprisingly ill-defined experimentally.

Zettl was the first to synthesize boron nitride nanotubes (BNNTs), for which (in sharp contrast to CNTs), the electronic and optical properties are relatively insensitive to wall number, diameter, and chirality. Zettl also found different ways to efficiently synthesize BNNTs, along with related BN-based nanomaterials such as BN nanococoons and BN aerogels. He also developed methods to functionalize the outer surfaces of BNNTs, and fill them with foreign chemical species creating new structures including silocrystals. Zettl showed experimentally that an electric field could be used to modulate the electronic band gap of BNNTs (giant Stark effect).

Nanoelectromechanical systems and advances in transmission electron microscopy

Zettl developed the transmission electron microscope (TEM) nanomanipulator, which allowed electrical and mechanical stimulation of nanoscale samples while they were being imaged inside the TEM. The nanomanipulator could be configured as a mechanical and/or electrical probe placed with atomic precision, as a scanning tunneling microscope, or as an atomic force microscope with simultaneous force measurement capability. Zettl used the nanomanipulator to prove that multi-wall CNT were composed of nested concentric cylinders rather than scrolls, and he determined the fundamental frictional forces between the cylinders. This led to his invention of the rotational nanomotor that employed nanotube bearings. Other inventions by Zettl that resulted were surface-tension-powered relaxation oscillators, tunable resonators, nanocrystal-powered linear motors, a fully integrated nanoradio receiver, a nanoballoon actuator, and nano-scale electrical and thermal rheostats. Zettl used the nanomanipulator to perform the first electron holography experiments on nanoscale materials, which quantified quantum mechanical field emission from CNTs. Using an architecture similar to that of his nanoradio, Zettl created a nanoelectromechanical "balance" which had single atom mass sensitivity, and with which he observed atomic shot noise for the first time. He developed a suspended graphene membrane that allowed for nearly real-time TEM imaging of individual carbon atom dynamics, and other isolated atomic and molecular species. Zettl's development of the TEM graphene liquid cell and graphene flow cell brought ultra-high-resolution real-time liquid phase imaging to the TEM world. Zettl also developed nanomechanical biological probes, tailored nanopores, and highly efficient wideband graphene-based mechanical energy transducers.

2D materials

Zettl has made key contributions to the synthesis and characterization of a host of 2D materials, including TaS_{2}, MoS_{2}, alloyed NbS_{2}, NbSe_{2}, and 2D quasicrystals. Zettl recently discovered a means to enhance and control quantum light emission in hexagonal-BN heterostructures, with implications for quantum information transmission and management.

Isolation of 1D chains and topological materials

In analogy to the isolation of 2D graphene from graphite, Zettl developed a method by which single or few chains of quasi 1D materials could be isolated and studied. He did this by synthesizing the materials in the confined (and protective) interior of CNTs and BNNTs. The method has yielded structures unknown in "bulk", with often interesting electronic properties (such as sharp metal-to-insulator transitions) and non-trivial topological properties. Atomically precise ultra-narrow nanoribbons were also created by Zettl via this confined growth method.

Liquid electronics

Using conducting nanoparticles softly "jammed" at the interface between two immiscible liquids, Zettl constructed electronic devices and "circuitry", thus realizing an effective paradigm for "all liquid electronics". Such constructs could facilitate easier reconfiguration or complete recycling of constituents once the circuit architecture becomes obsolete.

== Selected books, book chapters, and review articles ==
- S. Saito and A. Zettl, eds. Carbon Nanotubes: Quantum Cylinders of Graphene.

Contemporary Concepts of Condensed Matter Science, Volume 3, Pages 1–215 (2008)

- G. Grüner and A. Zettl. Charge density wave conduction: a novel collective transport phenomenon in solids. Phys. Reports 119, 117 (1985)
- A. Zettl. Chaos in solid state systems. In Methods and Applications of Nonlinear Dynamics, ACIF Series vol. 7, A. Saenz, ed. (World Scientific, Singapore, 1988), p. 203
- A. Zettl and G. Grüner. Routes to chaos in charge density wave systems. Comments in Cond. Matt. Phys. 12, 265 (1986)
- S. Brown and A. Zettl. Charge density wave current oscillations and interference effects. In Charge Density Waves in Solids, Modern Problems in Condensed Matter Science Series vol. 25, L. Gor'kov and G. Grüner, eds. (Elsevier, Amsterdam, 1989)
- A. Zettl, W.A. Vareka, and X.-D. Xiang. Intercalating high Tc oxide superconductors. In Quantum Theory of Real Materials, J.R. Chelilowsky and S.G. Louie, eds. (Kluwer Academic Publishers, Boston, 1996) p. 425
- J. C. Grossman, C. Piskoti, and A. Zettl. Molecular and Solid C36. In Fullerenes: Chemistry, Physics, and Technology, K. Kadish and R. Ruoff, ed. Chap 20, 887-916 (2000)
- N.G. Chopra and A. Zettl. Boron-Nitride-Containing Nanotubes. In Fullerenes: Chemistry, Physics, and Technology, K. Kadish and R. Ruoff, eds. Chap.17, 767-794 (2000)
- A. Zettl. New carbon materials. McGraw Hill Yearbook of Science & Technology. (McGraw Hill, 1999)
- A. Zettl and J. Cumings. Elastic properties of fullerenes. In Handbook of Elastic Properties of Solids, Liquids, and Gases, Levy, Bass, and Stern, eds. (Academic Press, 2000) Chapt. 11, pp. 163–171
- A. Kis and A. Zettl. Nanomechanics of carbon nanotubes. Phil. Trans. R. Soc. A 366, 1591-1611 (2008)
- M.L. Cohen and A. Zettl. The physics of boron nitride nanotubes. Physics Today 63 (11), 34-38 (2010)
- J. Park, V.P. Adiga, A. Zettl, and A.P. Alivisatos. High resolution imaging in the graphene liquid cell. In Liquid Cell Electron Microscopy, F.M. Ross, ed. (Cambridge University Press, Cambridge, U.K., (2017) p. 393.

== Awards and honors ==
IBM Pre–doctoral Fellowship (1982–1983); Presidential Young Investigator Award (1984–1989); Sloan Foundation Fellowship (1984–1986); IBM Faculty Development Award (1985–1987); Miller Professorship (1995); Lawrence Berkeley National Laboratory Outstanding Performance Award (1995); Lucent Technologies Faculty Award (1996); Fellow of the American Physical Society (1999); Lawrence Berkeley National Laboratory Outstanding Performance Award (2004); R&D 100 Award (2004); APS James C. McGroddy Prize for New Materials (Shared with Hongjie Dai) (2006), Miller Professorship (2007); R&D 100 Award (2010); Feynman Prize in Nanotechnology, Experimental (2013); Membership, American Academy of Arts and Sciences (2014); R&D 100 Award (2015); Clarivate Citation Laureate (2020)

== Personal life ==
Zettl is an outdoor enthusiast. He is an avid sea and whitewater kayaker and a whitewater rafter. He has guided numerous whitewater raft trips on class 5 rivers throughout California, and has guided wilderness descents of the Tatshenshini and Alsek Rivers in Alaska and a mid-winter descent of the Colorado River through the Grand Canyon. Zettl enjoys backcountry skiing and mountaineering, especially expedition climbing. He has led or co-led numerous climbing expeditions to the Alaska Range, the Saint Elias Range (Alaska and the Yukon), and the Andes of Ecuador, Peru, and Argentina. He has climbed technical routes on Denali, and completed a ski descent of Mt. Logan, Canada's highest peak. He has climbed extensively in the Sierra Nevada of California, the Cascades of the Pacific Northwest, the volcanoes of Mexico, the Alps of Germany, France, Switzerland, and Italy, the peaks of Morocco and Tanzania, the Alps of Japan and New Zealand, and in the Himalaya and Karakoram of Nepal and Pakistan. Zettl also enjoys designing and constructing amateur electronics, and building and operating off-road vehicles.
