= Probe tip =

Instrument used to physically scan the surface of a sample

A probe tip is an instrument used in scanning probe microscopes (SPMs) to scan the surface of a sample and make nano-scale images of surfaces and structures. The probe tip is mounted on the end of a cantilever and can be as sharp as a single atom. In microscopy, probe tip geometry (length, width, shape, aspect ratio, and tip apex radius) and the composition (material properties) of both the tip and the surface being probed directly affect resolution and imaging quality. Tip size and shape are extremely important in monitoring and detecting interactions between surfaces. SPMs can precisely measure electrostatic forces, magnetic forces, chemical bonding, Van der Waals forces, and capillary forces. SPMs can also reveal the morphology and topography of a surface.

The use of probe-based tools began with the invention of scanning tunneling microscopy (STM) and atomic force microscopy (AFM), collectively called scanning probe microscopy (SPM) by Gerd Binnig and Heinrich Rohrer at the IBM Zurich research laboratory in 1982. It opened a new era for probing the nano-scale world of individual atoms and molecules as well as studying surface science, due to their unprecedented capability to characterize the mechanical, chemical, magnetic, and optical functionalities of various samples at nanometer-scale resolution in a vacuum, ambient, or fluid environment.

The increasing demand for sub-nanometer probe tips is attributable to their robustness and versatility. Applications of sub-nanometer probe tips exist in the fields of nanolithography, nanoelectronics, biosensor, electrochemistry, semiconductor, micromachining and biological studies.

== History and development ==
Increasingly sharp probe tips have been of interest to researchers for applications in the material, life, and biological sciences, as they can map surface structure and material properties at molecular or atomic dimensions. The history of the probe tip can be traced back to 1859 with a predecessor of the modern gramophone, called the phonautograph. During the later development of the gramophone, the hog's hair used in the phonautograph was replaced with a needle used to reproduce sound. In 1940, a pantograph was built utilizing a shielded probe and adjustable tip. A stylus was free moving allowing it to slide vertically in contact with the paper. In 1948, a circuit was employed in the probe tip to measure peak voltage, creating what may be considered the first scanning tunneling microscope (STM). The fabrication of electrochemically etched sharp tungsten, copper, nickel and molybdenum tips were reported by Muller in 1937. A revolution in sharp tips then occurred, producing a variety of tips with different shapes, sizes, and aspect ratios. They composed of tungsten wire, silicon, diamond and carbon nanotubes with Si-based circuit technologies. This allowed the production of tips for numerous applications in the broad spectrum of nanotechnological fields.

Following the development of STM, atomic force microscopy (AFM) was developed by Gerd Binnig, Calvin F. Quate, and Christoph Gerber in 1986. Their instrument used a broken piece of diamond as the tip with a hand-cut gold foil cantilever. Focused ion and electron beam techniques for the fabrication of strong, stable, reproducible Si_{3}N_{4} pyramidal tips with 1.0 μm length and 0.1 μm diameter were reported by Russell in 1992. Significant advancement also came through the introduction of micro-fabrication methods for the creation of precise conical or pyramidal silicon and silicon nitride tips. Numerous research experiments were conducted to explore fabrication of comparatively less expensive and more robust tungsten tips, focusing on a need to attain less than 50 nm radius of curvature.

A new era in the field of fabrication of probe tips was reached when the carbon nanotube, an approximately 1 nm cylindrical shell of graphene, was introduced. The use of single wall carbon nanotubes makes the tips more flexible and less vulnerable to breaking or crushing during imaging. Probe tips made from carbon nano-tubes can be used to obtain high-resolution images of both soft and weakly adsorbed biomolecules like DNA on surfaces with molecular resolution.

Multifunctional hydrogel nano-probe techniques also advanced tip fabrication and resulted in increased applicability for inorganic and biological samples in both air and liquid. The biggest advantage of this mechanical method is that the tip can be made in different shapes, such as hemispherical, embedded spherical, pyramidal, and distorted pyramidal, with diameters ranging from 10 nm – 1000 nm. This covers applications including topography or functional imaging, force spectroscopy on soft matter, biological, chemical and physical sensors. Table 1. Summarizes various methods for fabricating probe tips, and the associated materials and applications.

Table 1. Summary of various fabrication methods, materials and applications of probe tips
Fabrication Method(s)	Material(s)	Application(s)	References
Grinding, cutting, fracture, center aligned	Diamond	Nanoindentation, 2D profiling in semiconductor, doping type and concentration of native silicon oxide	
Beam Ion Milling	Diamond	Local electrical characterization of thin metal–oxide–semiconductor dielectrics, conducting AFM	
Field ion microscope(y)	SiO_{x}, Si_{3}N_{4,} quartz	Nanoelectronics, bond strength in biomolecules	
etching	W, W, Ag, Pt, Ir, Au	Semiconductor, nano-patterning, metal surface imaging	
Hydrogel	Poly- (ethylene glycol) diacrylate	Biological soft and hard sample, dip-pen nanolithography	
RIE-Reactive-ion etching	Diamond	Forces (SFM), optical properties (SNOM)	
Glue	Polymers, carbon nanotube	Charge density waves on the surface of conducting material, imaging of single atom	
Single atom functionalized	Single CO_{2} molecule attached to metal tip	Bond-order, catalysis, chemical structure	
Electron beam deposition	Silicon	Lithography, high resolution imaging	
Chemical vapor deposition	CNT, diamond	Electronic devices, Semi-conductor	

== Tunneling current and force measurement principle ==
The tip itself does not have any working principle for imaging, but depending on the instrumentation, mode of application, and the nature of the sample under investigation, the probe's tip may follow different principles to image the surface of the sample. For example, when a tip is integrated with STM, it measures the tunneling current that arises from the interaction between the sample and the tip. In AFM, short-ranged force deflection during the raster scan by the tip across the surface is measured. A conductive tip is essential for the STM instrumentation whereas AFM can use conductive and non-conductive probe tip. Although the probe tip is used in various techniques with different principles, for STM and AFM coupled with probe tip is discussed in detail.

=== Conductive probe tip ===
As the name implies, STM utilizes the tunneling charge transfer principle from tip to surface or vice versa, thereby recording the current response. This concept originates from a particle in a box concept; if potential energy for a particle is small, the electron may be found outside of the potential well, which is a classically forbidden region. This phenomenon is called tunneling.

Expression derived from Schrödinger equation for transmission charge transfer probability is as follows:

$T=16\epsilon(1-\epsilon)^{-2k}$

where

$$\epsilon = \frac{E}{V} = \text{Kinetic energy/potential energy}$$
$$k = 2\pi \sqrt{\frac{2mE}{h}}$$
$h$ is the Planck constant

=== Non-conductive probe tip ===
Non-conductive nanoscale tips are widely used for AFM measurements. For non-conducting tip, surface forces acting on the tip/cantilever are responsible for deflection or attraction of tip. These attractive or repulsive forces are used for surface topology, chemical specifications, magnetic and electronic properties. The distance-dependent forces between substrate surface and tip are responsible for imaging in AFM. These interactions include van der Waals forces, capillary forces, electrostatic forces, Casimir forces, and solvation forces. One unique repulsion force is Pauli Exclusion repulsive force, which is responsible for single-atom imaging as in references and Figures 10 & 11 (contact region in Fig. 1).

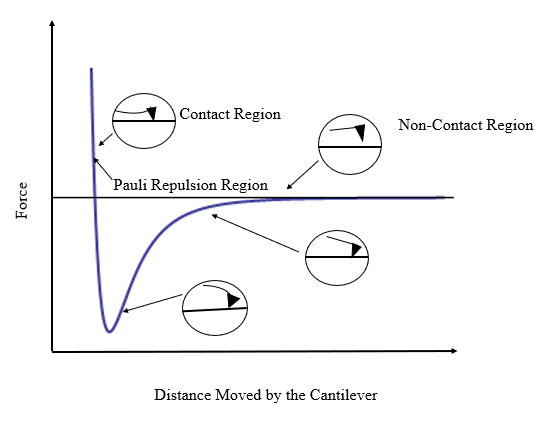
Fig. 1: Typical forces dependence on probe substrate distance.

== Fabrication methods ==
Tip fabrication techniques fall into two broad classifications, mechanical and physicochemical. In the early stage of the development of probe tips, mechanical procedures were popular because of the ease of fabrication.

=== Mechanical methods ===
Reported mechanical methods in fabricating tips include cutting, grinding, and pulling.; an example would be cutting a wire at certain angles with a razor blade, wire cutter, or scissors. Another mechanical method for tip preparation is fragmentation of bulk pieces into small pointy pieces. Grinding a metal wire or rod into a sharp tip was also a method used. These mechanical procedures usually leave rugged surfaces with many tiny asperities protruding from the apex, which led to atomic resolution on flat surfaces. However, irregular shape and large macroscopic radius of curvature result in poor reproducibility and decreased stability especially for probing rough surfaces. Another main disadvantage of making probes by this method is that it creates many mini tips which lead to many different signals, yielding error in imaging. Cutting, grinding and pulling procedures can only be adapted for metallic tips like W, Ag, Pt, Ir, Pt-Ir and gold. Non-metallic tips cannot be fabricated by these methods.

In contrast, a sophisticated mechanical method for tip fabrication is based on the hydro-gel method. This method is based on a bottom-up strategy to make probe tips by a molecular self-assembly process. A cantilever is formed in a mould by curing the pre-polymer solution, then it is brought into contact with the mould of the tip which also contains the pre-polymer solution. The polymer is cured with ultraviolet light which helps to provide a firm attachment of the cantilever to the probe. This fabrication method is shown in Fig. 2.

=== Physio-chemical procedures ===
Physiochemical procedures are fabrication methods of choice, which yield extremely sharp and symmetric tips, with more reproducibility compared to mechanical fabrication-based tips. Among physicochemical methods, the electrochemical etching method is one of the most popular methods. Etching is a two or more step procedure. The "zone electropolishing" is the second step which further sharpens the tip in a very controlled manner. Other physicochemical methods include chemical vapor deposition and electron beam deposition onto pre-existing tips. Other tip fabrication methods include field ion microscopy and ion milling. In field ion microscopy techniques, consecutive field evaporation of single atoms yields specific atomic configuration at the probe tip, which yields very high resolution.

==== Fabrication through etching ====
Electrochemical etching is one of the most widely accepted metallic probe tip fabrication methods. Three commonly used electrochemical etching methods for tungsten tip fabrication are single lamella drop-off methods, double lamella drop-off method, and submerged method. Various cone shape tips can be fabricated by this method by minor changes in the experimental setup. A DC potential is applied between the tip and a metallic electrode (usually W wire) immersed in solution (Figure 3 a-c); electrochemical reactions at cathode and anode in basic solutions (2M KOH or 2M NaOH) are usually used. The overall etching process involved is as follows:

Anode;

$\ce{W (s) + 8OH- -> WO4 + 4H2O + 6e- (E= 1.05V)}$

Cathode:

$\ce{6H2O + 6e- -> 3H2 + 6OH- (E=-2.48V)}$

Overall:

$\ce{W (s) + 2OH- -> WO4^2- + 2H2O (l) + 6e- + 3H2 (g) (E= -1.43V)}$

Here, all the potentials are reported vs. SHE.

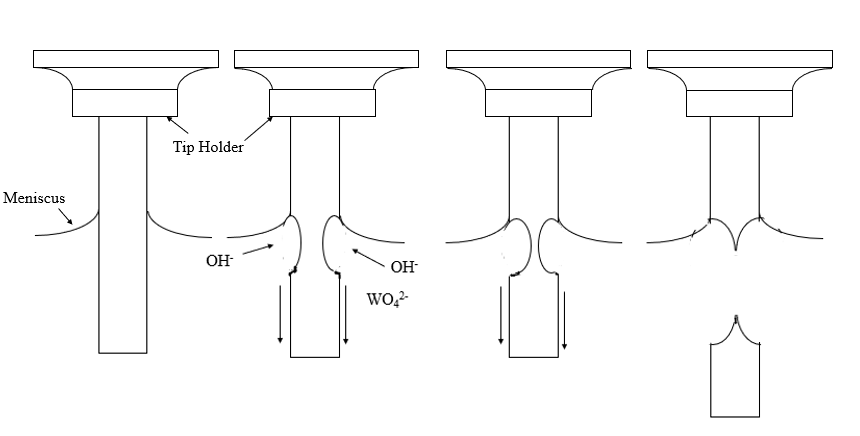
Fig. 3: Schematics of the fabrication method of probe tip through electrochemical etching method.

The schematics of the fabrication method of probe tip production through the electrochemical etching method is shown in Fig. 3.

In the electrochemical etching process, W is etched at the liquid, solid, and air interface; this is due to surface tension, as shown in Fig. 3. Etching is called static if the W wire is kept stationary. Once the tip is etched, the lower part falls due to the lower tensile strength than the weight of the lower part of the wire. The irregular shape is produced by the shifting of the meniscus. However, slow etching rates can produce regular tips when the current flows slowly through the electrochemical cells. Dynamic etching involves slowly pulling up the wire from the solution, or sometimes the wire is moved up and down (oscillating wire) producing smooth tips.

==== Submerged method ====
In this method, a metal wire is vertically etched, reducing the diameter from 0.25 mm ~ 20 nm. A schematic diagram for probe tip fabrication with submerged electrochemical etching method is illustrated in Fig 4. These tips can be used for high-quality STM images.

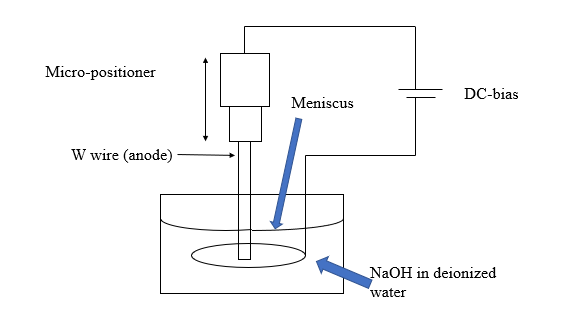
Fig. 4: Schematic diagram for probe tip fabrication with submerged electrochemical etching method (W wire)

==== Lamella method ====
In the double lamella method, the lower part of the metal is etched away, and the upper part of the tip is not etched further. Further etching of the upper part of the wire is prevented by covering it with a polymer coating. This method is usually limited to laboratory fabrication. The double lamella method schematic is shown in Fig. 5.

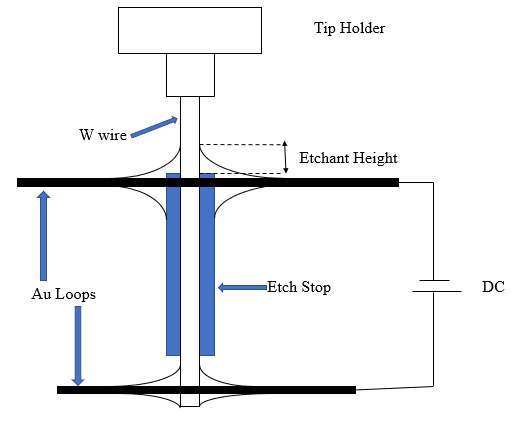
Fig. 5: A typical double-lamella drop-off electrochemical etching set up

=== Single atom tip preparation ===
Transitional metals like Cu, Au and Ag adsorb single molecules linearly on their surface due to weak van der Waals forces. This linear projection of single molecules allows interactions of the terminal atoms of the tip with the atoms of the substrate, resulting in Pauli repulsion for single molecule or atom mapping studies. Gaseous deposition on the tip is carried out in an ultrahigh vacuum (5 × 10^{−8} mbar) chamber at a low temperature (10K). Depositions of Xe, Kr, NO, CH_{4} or CO on tip have been successfully prepared and used for imaging studies. However, these tips preparations rely on the attachment of single atoms or molecules on the tip and the resulting atomic structure of the tip is not known exactly. The probability of attachment of simple molecules on metal surfaces is very tedious and required great skill; as such, this method is not widely used.

=== Chemical vapor deposition (CVD) ===
Sharp tips used in SPM are fragile, and prone to wear and tear under high working loads. Diamond is considered the best option to address this issue. Diamond tips for SPMs are fabricated by fracturing, grinding and polishing bulk diamond, resulting in a considerable loss of diamond. One alternative is depositing a thin diamond film on Silicone tips by CVD. In CVD, diamond is deposited directly on silicon or W cantilevers. A is shown in Fig. 6. In this method, the flow of methane and hydrogen gas is controlled to maintain an internal pressure of 40 Torr inside the chamber. CH_{4} and H_{2} dissociate at 2100 °C with the help of the Ta filament, and nucleation sites are created on the tip of the cantilever. Once CVD is complete, the flow of CH_{4} is stopped and the chamber is cooled under the flow of H_{2}. A schematic diagram of a CVD setup used for diamond tip fabrication for AFM application is shown in Fig. 6.

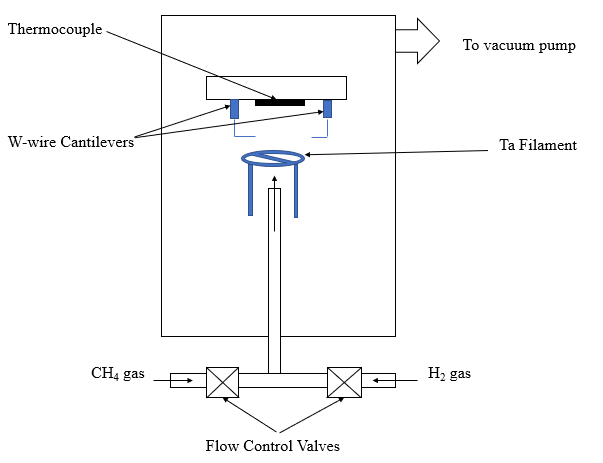
Fig. 6: Schematics of CVD set up for diamond tip fabrication for AFM application

=== Reactive ion etching (RIE) fabrication ===
A groove or structure is made on a substrate to form a template. The desired material is then deposited in that template. Once the tip is formed, the template is etched off, leaving the tip and cantilever. Fig. 7 illustrates diamond tip fabrication on silicon wafers using this method.

=== Focused ion beam (FIB) milling ===
FIB milling is a sharpening method for probe tips in SPM. A blunt tip is first fabricated by other etching methods, such as CVD, or the use of a pyramid mold for pyramidal tips. This tip is then sharpened by FIB milling as shown in Fig. 8. The diameter of the focused ion beam, which directly affects the tip's final diameter, is controlled through a programmable aperture.

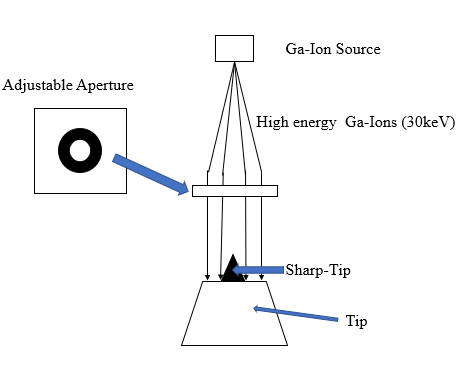
Fig 8: Schematics of focused ion beam milling method for probe tip sharpening

=== Glue ===
This method is used to attach carbon nanotubes to a cantilever or blunt tip. A strong adhesive (such as soft acrylic glue) is used to bind CNT with the silicon cantilever. CNT is robust, stiff and increases the durability of probe tips, and can be used for both contact and tapping mode.

== Cleaning procedures ==
Electrochemically etched tips are usually covered with contaminants on their surfaces which cannot be removed simply by rinsing in water, acetone or ethanol. Some oxide layers on metallic tips, especially on tungsten, need to be removed by post-fabrication treatment.

=== Annealing ===
To clean W sharp tips, it is highly desirable to remove contaminant and the oxide layer. In this method a tip is heated in an UHV chamber at elevated temperature which desorb the contaminated layer. The reaction details are shown below.

2WO_{3} + W → 3WO_{2} ↑

WO_{2} → W (sublimation at $\backsim$1075K)

At elevated temperature, trioxides of W are converted to WO_{2} which sublimates around 1075K, and cleaned metallic W surfaces are left behind. An additional advantage provided by annealing is the healing of crystallographic defects produced by fabrication, and the process also smoothens the tip surface.

=== HF chemical cleaning ===
In the HF cleaning method, a freshly prepared tip is dipped in 15% concentrated hydrofluoric acid for 10 to 30 seconds, which dissolves the oxides of W.

=== Ion milling ===
In this method, argon ions are directed at the tip surface to remove the contaminant layer by sputtering. The tip is rotated in a flux of argon ions at a certain angle, in a way that allows the beam to target the apex. The bombardment of ions at the tip depletes the contaminants and also results in a reduction of the radius of the tip. The bombardment time needs to be finely tuned with respect to the shape of the tip. Sometimes, short annealing is required after ion milling.

=== Self-sputtering ===
This method is very similar to ion milling, but in this procedure, the UHV chamber is filled with neon at a pressure of 10^{−4} mbar. When a negative voltage is applied on the tip, a strong electric field (produced by tip under negative potential) will ionize the neon gas, and these positively charged ions are accelerated back to the tip, where they cause sputtering. The sputtering removes contaminants and some atoms from the tip which, like ion milling, reduces the apex radius. By changing the field strength, one can tune the radius of the tip to 20 nm.

== Coating ==
The surface of silicon-based tips cannot be easily controlled because they usually carry the silanol group. The Si surface is hydrophilic and can be contaminated easily by the environment. Another disadvantage of Si tips is the wear and tear of the tip. It is important to coat the Si tip to prevent tip deterioration, and the tip coating may also enhance image quality. To coat a tip, an adhesive layer is pasted (usually chromium layer on 5 nm thick titanium) and then gold is deposited by vapor deposition (40-100 nm or less). Sometimes, the coating layer reduces the tunnelling current detection capability of probe tips.

== Characterization ==
The most important aspect of a probe tip is imaging the surfaces efficiently at nanometre dimensions. Some concerns involving credibility of the imaging or measurement of the sample arise when the shape of the tip is not determined accurately. For example, when an unknown tip is used to measure a linewidth pattern or other high aspect ratio feature of a surface, there may remain some confusion when determining the contribution of the tip and of the sample in the acquired image. Consequently, it is important to fully and accurately characterize the tips. Probe tips can be characterized for their shape, size, sharpness, bluntness, aspect ratio, radius of curvature, geometry and composition using many advanced instrumental techniques. For example, electron field emission measurement, scanning electron microscopy (SEM), transmission electron microscopy (TEM), scanning tunnelling spectroscopy as well as more easily accessible optical microscope. In some cases, optical microscopy cannot provide exact measurements for small tips in nanoscale due to the resolution limitation of the optical microscopy.

=== Electron field emission current measurement ===
In the electron field emission current measurement method, a high voltage is applied between the tip and another electrode, followed by measuring field emission current employing Fowler-Nordheim curves $[\log_{10}(1/V^2) vs. (1/V)]$. Large fields-emission current measurements may indicate that the tip is sharp, and low field-emission current indicates that the tip is blunt, molten or mechanically damaged. A minimum voltage is essential to facilitate the release of electrons from the surface of the tip which in turn indirectly is used to obtain the tip curvature. Although this method has several advantages, a disadvantage is that the high electric field required for producing strong electric force can melt the apex of the tip, or might change the crystallographic tip nature.

=== Scanning electron microscopy and transmission electron microscopy ===
The size and shape of the tip can be obtained by scanning electron microscopy and transmission electron microscopy measurements. In addition, transmission electron microscopy (TEM) images are helpful to detect any layer of insulating materials on the surface of the tip as well as to estimate the size of the layer. These oxides are formed gradually on the surface of tip soon after fabrication, due to the oxidation of the metallic tip by reacting with the O_{2} present in the surrounding atmosphere. Scanning electron microscopy (SEM) has a resolution limitation of below 4 nm, so TEM may be needed to observe even a single atom theoretically and practically. Tip grain down to 1-3 nm, thin polycrystalline oxides, or carbon or graphite layers at the tip apex, are routinely measured using TEM. The orientation of tip crystal, which is the angle between the tip plane in the single-crystal and the tip normal, can be estimated.

=== Optical microscopy ===
In the past, optical microscopes were the only method used to investigate whether the tip is bent, through microscale imaging at many microscales. This is because the resolution limitation of an optical microscope is about 200 nm. Imaging software, including ImageJ, allows determination of the curvature, and aspect ratio of the tip. One drawback of this method is that it renders an image of tip, which is an object due to the uncertainty in the nanoscale dimension. This problem can be resolved by taking images of the tip multiple times, followed by combining them into an image by confocal microscope with some fluorescent material coating on the tip. It is also a time-consuming process due to the necessity of monitoring the wear or damage or degradation of the tip by collision with the surface during scanning the surface after each scan.

=== Scanning tunneling spectroscopy ===
The scanning tunneling spectroscopy (STS) is spectroscopic form of STM. Spectroscopic data based on curvature is obtained to analyze the existence of any oxides or impurities on the tip. This is done by monitoring the linearity of the curve, which represents metallic tunnel junction. Generally, the curve is non-linear; hence, the tip has a gap-like shape around zero bias voltage for oxidized or impure tip, whereas the opposite is observed for sharp pure un-oxidized tip.

=== Auger electron spectroscopy, X-ray photoelectron spectroscopy ===
In Auger electron spectroscopy (AES), any oxides present on the tip surface are sputtered out during in-depth analysis with argon ion beam generated by differentially pumped ion pump, followed by comparing the sputtering rate of the oxide with experimental sputtering yields. These Auger measurements may estimate the nature of oxides because of the surface contamination. Composition can also be revealed, and in some cases, thickness of the oxide layer down to 1-3 nm can be estimated. X-ray photoelectron spectroscopy also performs similar characterization for the chemical and surface composition, by providing information on the binding energy of the surface elements.

Overall, the aforementioned characterization methods of tips can be categorized into three major classes. They are as follows:

- Imaging tip using microscopy is used to take image of tip with microscopy, except scanning probe microscopy (SPM) e.g. scanning tunnelling microscopy (STM), atomic force microscopy (AFM) are reported.
- Using known tip characterizer is when the shape of tip is deduced by taking an image of a sample of known measurement, which is known as tip characterizer.
- Blind method is where tip characterizer of either known or unknown measurement is used.

== Applications ==
Probes tips have a wide variety of applications in different fields of science and technology. One of the major areas where probe tips are used is for application in SPM i.e., STM and AFM. For example, carbon nanotube tips in conjunction with AFM provides an excellent tool for surface characterization in the nanometer realm. CNT tips are also used in tapping-mode Scanning Force Microscopy (SFM), which is a technique where a tip taps a surface by a cantilever driven near resonant frequency of the cantilever. The CNT probe tips fabricated using CVD technique can be used for imaging of biological macromolecules, semiconductor and chemical structure. For example, it is possible to obtain an intermittent AFM contact image of IgM macromolecules with excellent resolution using a single CNT tip. Individual CNT tips can be used for high resolution imaging of protein molecules.

In another application, multiwall carbon nanotube (MWCNT) and single wall carbon nanotube (SWCNT) tips were used to image amyloid β (1-40) derived protofibrils and fibrils by tapping mode AFM. Functionalized probes can be used in Chemical Force Microscopy (CFM) to measure intermolecular forces and map chemical functionality. Functionalized SWCNT probes can be used for chemically sensitive imaging with high lateral resolution and to study binding energy in chemical and biological system. Probe tips that have been functionalized with either hydrophobic or hydrophilic molecules can be used to measure the adhesive interaction between hydrophobic-hydrophobic, hydrophobic-hydrophilic, and hydrophilic-hydrophilic molecules. From these adhesive interactions the friction image of patterned sample surface can be found. Probe tips used in force microscopy can provide imaging of structure and dynamics of adsorbate at the nanometer scale. Self-assembled functionalized organic thiols on the surface of Au coated Si_{3}N_{4} probe tips have been used to study the interaction between molecular groups. Again, carbon nanotube probe tips in conjunction with AFM can be used for probing crevices that occur in microelectronic circuits with improved lateral resolution. Functionality modified probe tips have been to measure the binding force between single protein-ligand pairs. Probe tips have been used as a tapping mode technique to provide information about the elastic properties of materials. Probe tips are also used in the mass spectrometer. Enzymatically active probe tips have been used for the enzymatic degradation of analytes. They have also been used as devices to introduce samples into the mass spectrophotometer. For example, trypsin-activated gold (Au/trypsin) probe tips can be used for the peptide mapping of the hen egg lysozyme.

Atomically sharp probe tips can be used for imaging a single atom in a molecule. An example of visualizing single atoms in water cluster can be seen in Fig. 10. By visualizing single atoms in molecules present on a surface, scientists can determine bond length, bond order and discrepancies, if any, in conjugation which was previously thought to be impossible in experimental work. Fig. 9 shows the experimentally determined bond order in a poly-aromatic compound, which was thought to be very hard in the past.

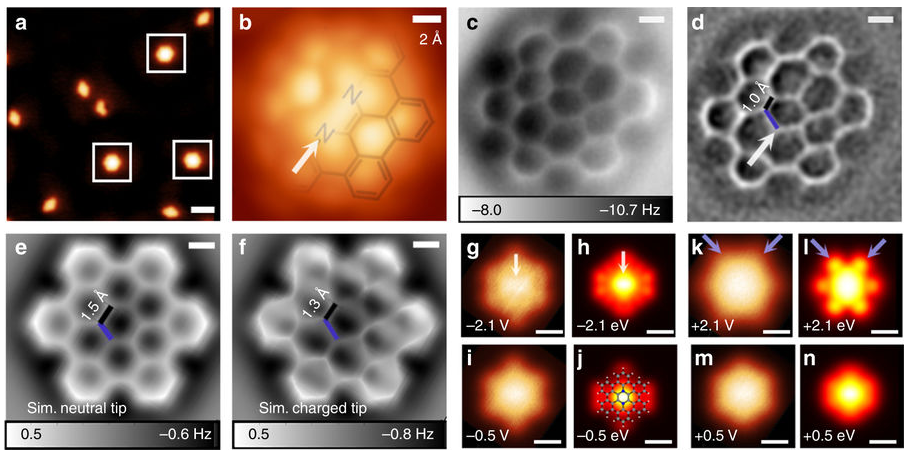
Fig. 9: On-surface homocoupling of precursor 5c yields fully planar and neutral diaza-HBC 7c on Ag(111). a Scanning tunneling microscopy (STM) overview of reaction product and unreacted species on Ag(111). V _{s} = 30 mV, I _{t} = 10 pA. b Constant-height STM data of diaza-HBC with partially superposed molecular model. V _{s} = 5 mV. c Frequency-modulated atomic force microscopy (FM-AFM) and d Laplace-filtered FM-AFM data reveal details in the molecular structure. Apparent C = C distance 1.0 Å (black), and N–C 1.8 Å (blue). e FM-AFM simulations of 7c employing a neutral tip. Apparent C = C distance 1.5 Å (black), N–C 1.5 Å (blue). f FM-AFM simulations employing a negatively charged probe tip. Apparent C = C distance 1.3 Å (black), N-C 1.9 Å (blue). For simulation parameters see Methods. g–n Constant-height STM data (g, i, k, m) at different biases and corresponding (h, j, l, n) DFT simulations. White arrows point to N atoms oriented along the diaza-HBC symmetry axis. Scale bars (a) 20 Å, (b–f) 2 Å, (g–n) 5 Å

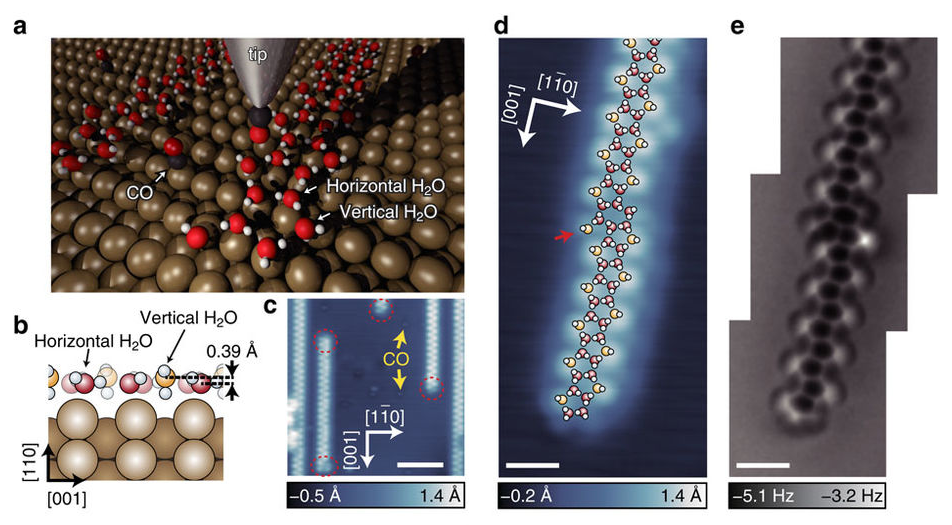
Fig. 10: (a) Schematic of STM/AFM measurement for pentagonal water chains on Cu(110) with a CO-terminal tip. Red, black, white and brown spheres show O, C, H and Cu atoms, respectively. (b) Side-view schematic of the water chain. Red (yellow) spheres represent O atoms of horizontal (vertical) H_{2}O. (c) STM image of the water chains on Cu(110) with a CO-terminal tip (sample bias V=30 mV, tunneling current I=20 pA). The zigzag chains have terminals (red ellipses). (d,e) STM (V=30 mV, I=20 pA) and AFM (V=0 mV, oscillation amplitude A=2 Å) images, respectively, of a water chain including a kink and a terminal. An atomic structure of the chain is superposed in d. The tip height in e was set over the bare surface under the same conditions as in d. (f) Δf map of the pentagonal chain at a tip height Δz=−2 Å (A=1 Å). (g) Δf(Δz) curves recorded over the markers in f. (h) Force map of the chain at Δz=−1.95 Å after subtraction of the force for the bare surface F_{Cu}. (i) Force curves over the makers in f after subtraction of F_{Cu}(Δz). Scale bars, 50 Å (c); 10 Å (d,e); 3 Å (f,h).
