= Scanning microscopy =

Scanning microscopy may refer to:

- Scanning probe microscopy
- Atomic force microscopy
- Scanning tunneling microscope
- Scanning electron microscope
- Scanning capacitance microscopy
- Near-field scanning optical microscope
