= Sara Majetich =

American physicist

Sara A. Majetich
- Education: Princeton University; Columbia University; University of Georgia
- Scientific career
- Workplaces: Carnegie Mellon University
- Thesis: Phonon dynamics in alexandrite and ruby (1987)

Sara A. Majetich is an American physicist and Professor of Physics at Carnegie Mellon University. Her work considers magnetic nanoparticles and nanostructures for application in spintronic devices. She is a Fellow of the American Physical Society and the Institute of Electrical and Electronics Engineers.

== Early life and education ==
Majetich started her scientific career at Princeton University where she majored in chemistry. After graduating she moved to Columbia University, where she worked toward a master's degree in physical chemistry. Majetich was a doctoral student at the University of Georgia, where she studied phonon dynamics in ruby. After earning her doctorate Majetich moved to Cornell University, where she worked as postdoctoral research associate. In 1992 she was awarded an National Science Foundation National Young Investigator Award.

== Research and career ==
In 1995 Majetich joined the faculty at Carnegie Mellon University. She was promoted to Professor of Physics in 1998. Majetich studies magnetic nanoparticles for magnetic imaging and magnetic data storage. These nanoparticles have very uniform sizes (i.e. they are monodisperse), which means that they can form arrays. She made use of magnetic transmission electron microscopy (Lorentz microscopy) to study the collective behaviour of magnetic nanoparticles, and showed that structural disorder disrupts self-assembly into ordered domains and can result in spin-glass dynamics. As nanoparticles assembly into ordered arrays various phase transitions can be expected, such as superparamagnetic to ferromagnetic and insulator to metal.

To this end, she developed a nano-masking process which allows for the transfer of patterns into multi-layer magnetic films. This process involves argon-ion milling to transfer the pattern of metal oxide nanoparticles into oriented, multi-layer thin films and magnetic tunnel junctions.

Majetich pioneered the use of conductive atomic force microscopy to measure magnetoresistance.

== Awards and honors ==
- 1992 NSF National Young Investigator Award
- 2007 Elected Fellow of the American Physical Society
- 2007 IEEE Magnetics Society Distinguished Lecturer
- 2010 Carnegie Mellon University Science Award
- 2016 Elected Fellow of the Institute of Electrical and Electronics Engineers

== Select publications ==
- Yueqiang Liu; Sara A Majetich; Robert D Tilton; David S Sholl; Gregory V Lowry (1 March 2005). "TCE dechlorination rates, pathways, and efficiency of nanoscale iron particles with different properties". Environmental Science & Technology. 39 (5): 1338–1345. doi:10.1021/es049195r. ISSN 0013-936X. PMID 15787375. Wikidata Q43320309.
- Robert L Stamps; Stephan Breitkreutz; Johan Åkerman; et al. (18 July 2014). "The 2014 Magnetism Roadmap". Journal of Physics D. 47 (33) 333001. arXiv:1410.6404. doi:10.1088/0022-3727/47/33/333001. ISSN 0022-3727. Wikidata Q57386051.
- Yueqiang Liu; Sara A Majetich; Robert D Tilton; David S Sholl; Gregory V Lowry (1 March 2005). "TCE dechlorination rates, pathways, and efficiency of nanoscale iron particles with different properties". Environmental Science & Technology. 39 (5): 1338–1345. doi:10.1021/es049195r. ISSN 0013-936X. PMID 15787375. Wikidata Q43320309.
