= Christoph Gerber =

Swiss physicist

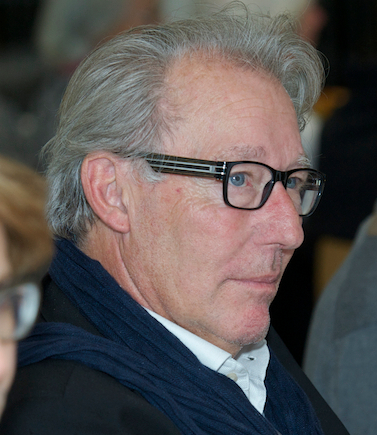
- Gerber in 2013
- Born: May 15, 1942 (age 84); Basel, Switzerland
- Known for: Atomic force microscope
- Scientific career
- Workplaces: IBM Research; University of Basel

Christoph Gerber (born 1942) is a Swiss physicist and professor at the University of Basel. He is the co-inventor of the atomic force microscope (AFM), together with Gerd Binnig and Calvin Quate.

He was a founding member and director for scientific communication of the NCCR (National Center of Competence in Research Nanoscale Science). He was formerly a research staff member in nanoscale science at the IBM Research Laboratory in Rueschlikon, Switzerland, and has served as a project leader in various programs of the Swiss National Science Foundation.

For the past 40 years, his research has been focused on nanoscale science. He is a pioneer in scanning probe microscopy, who made major contributions to the invention of the scanning tunneling microscope, the AFM, and AFM techniques in high vacuum and at low temperatures.

He is also the author of several patents.

== Career ==
Gerber was born in Basel in 1942 and raised there. After obtaining a degree in mechanical engineering, he briefly worked for Contraves (today part of Rheinmetall Air Defence) in Stockholm. In 1966, he returned to Switzerland to work at IBM in Rüschlikon, Switzerland. Here, he worked on a project developing the scanning transmission electron microscope, for which his colleagues Heinrich Rohrer and Gerd Binnig would later win the Nobel Prize in Physics.

In 1986, together with Gerd Binnig and Calvin Quate of Stanford University, Gerber published the article describing the atomic force microscope in Physical Review Letters.

== Awards ==
His work has been recognized with multiple honorary degrees and various awards and appeared in numerous articles in daily press and TV coverage. 2016 he has been awarded the Kavli Prize in Nanoscience together with Gerd Binnig and Calvin Quate for the scanning force microscope. He became a fellow of the Norwegian Academy of Science and Letters. He is a Fellow of the American Physical Society and a Fellow of the Institute of Physics UK.
