= Heinrich Rohrer Medal =

- First award: 2014
- Website: Heinrich Rohrer Medal

Heinrich Rohrer Medals are a series of awards presented to celebrate the late Nobel laureate Heinrich Rohrer for his work in the fields of nanoscience and nanotechnology, and specifically for co-creating the scanning tunneling microscope. Medals are awarded triennially by the Surface Science Society of Japan with IBM Research – Zurich, Swiss Embassy in Japan, and Ms. Rohrer. The Grand Medal is for a single researcher who has made "distinguished achievements in the field of nanoscience and nanotechnology based on surface science" but can be awarded to several individuals. The Rising Medal is presented to up to three researchers upwards of 37 years in age each with different topics. The Rising Medal is given for their outstanding efforts with the assumption that they will continue to actively work in their respective fields. Medals are given with a framed certificate and a cash prize of JPY 1,000,000 for the Grand Medal and JPY 300,000 for the Rising Medal.

Awards have been presented in 2014 and 2017 and is scheduled to be presented in November 2020 at the 9th International Symposium on Surface Science (ISSS9) in Takamatsu, Japan. The 2020 medals will be presented and laureates are requested to give award lectures at the upcoming ISSS9.

== Laureates ==
=== Grand Medal ===
Year	Laureate	Institution	Citation
2014	Roland Wiesendanger	University of Hamburg, Germany	"For his pioneering and ground-breaking achievements on spin-resolved scanning tunneling microscopy and spectroscopy, bringing about very deep insights in spin-related properties of materials at atomic scale"
2017	Joseph A. Stroscio	National Institute of Standards and Technology (NIST), U.S.A	"For his pioneering achievements on spectroscopic capability of scanning tunneling microscopy opening novel perspectives for revealing the quantum nature of the nano-world"
2020	Andreas J. Heinrich	Center for Quantum Nanoscience of the Institute for Basic Science, Ewha Womans University, Korea	"For his ground-breaking development of scanning tunneling microscope methods to study the spin properties of magnetic atoms on surfaces for revealing the quantum nature of the magnetism at the atomic scale"
2024	Franz Josef Giessibl	Universität Regensburg, Germany	"For the invention of the qPlus force sensor, which proved that sub-atomic spatial resolution is achievable in atomic force microscopy (AFM) and scanning probe microscopy (SPM), revolutionizing their range of applications for both AFM and SPM"
2024	Wilson Ho	University of California, Irvine, USA	"For the development of scanning tunneling microscopy-based inelastic electron tunneling spectroscopy (STM-IETS), enabling the detection of various chemical and physical properties of single atoms and molecules, thereby opening up quantitative science by STM"

=== Rising Medal ===
Year	Laureate	Institution	Citation
2014	Yoshiaki Sugimoto	Osaka University, Japan	"For his outstanding contributions to manipulation and chemical identification of individual atoms using atomic force microscopy"
2014	Jan Hugo Dil	École Polytechnique Fédérale de Lausanne, Switzerland	"For his leading and creative roles in identifying novel spin structures using synchrotron radiation-based spin- and angle-resolved photoemission spectroscopy"
2017	Sascha Schäfer	University of Göttingen, Germany	"For his outstanding contributions to the development and application of ultrafast electron microscopy and diffraction"
2017	Alfred J. Weymouth	University of Regensburg, Germany	"For his valuable contributions to force microscopy at the atomic scale including studying the interplay of current and force, applications of lateral force microscopy, and imaging in ambient conditions"
2020	Takashi Kumagai	Fritz Haber Institute of the Max Planck Society, Germany	"For his outstanding achievements in the field of near-field physics and chemistry in plasmonic STM junctions"
2024	Yi Chen	Peking University, China	"For the pioneering contributions that have pushed the boundaries of scanning tunneling microscopy along two directions which are the creation of the first atomic scale multi-qubit platform and the innovative visualization of exotic excitations in a quantum spin liquid"
2024	Miyabi Imai-Imada	Riken, Japan	"For the significant achievement of the first atomic-scale visualization of photocurrent channels within a single molecule by the development of resonant fluorescence utilizing tunable laser techniques for single-molecule spectroscopy"

== See also ==
- Feynman Prize in Nanotechnology
- Kavli Prize
- List of physics awards
