= Franz Josef Giessibl =

German physicist

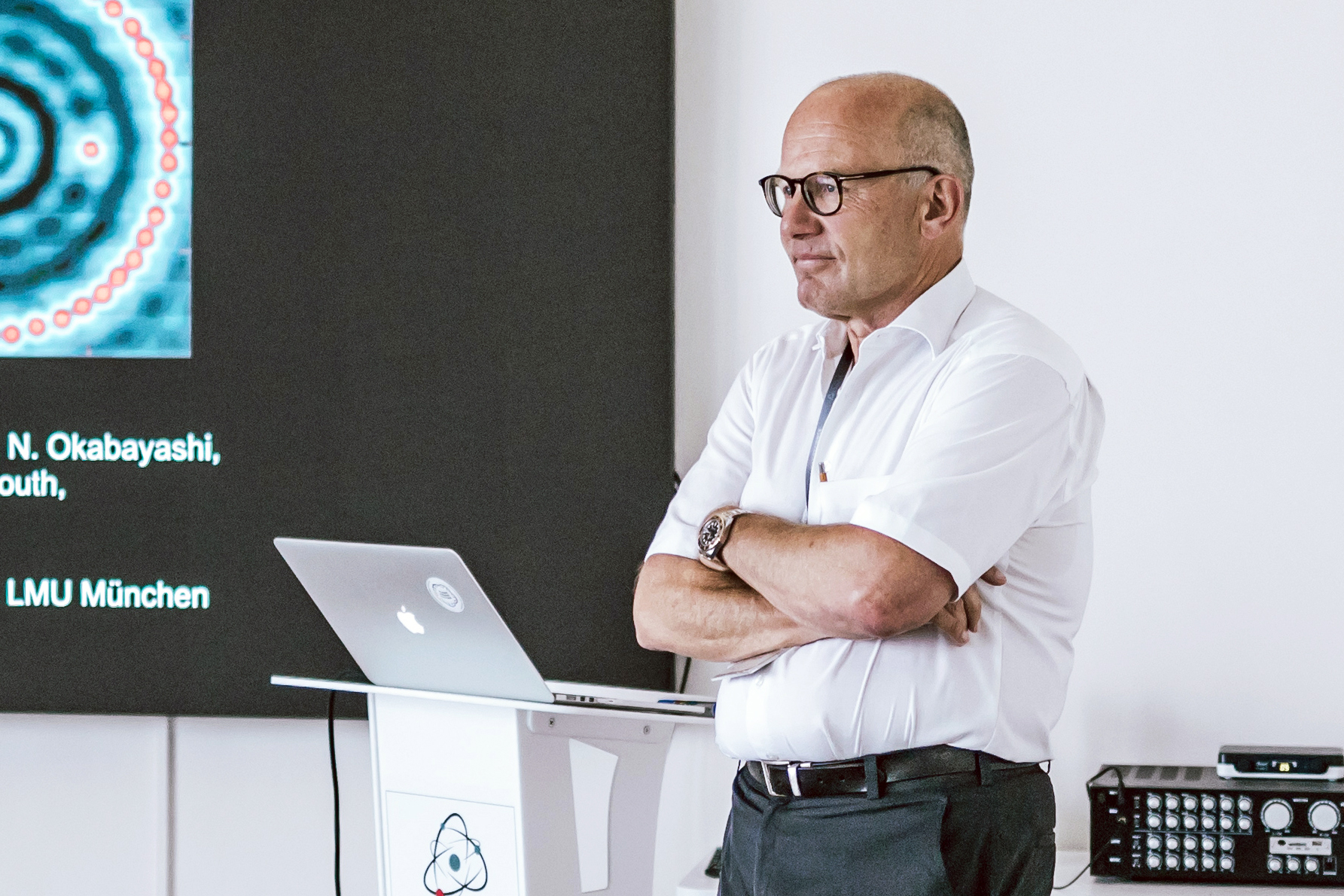
- Born: 27 May 1962
- Education: Eidgenössische Technische Hochschule Zürich, Technical University of Munich
- Scientific career
- Fields: Experimental physics
- Workplaces: University of Regensburg
- Academic advisors: Gerd Binnig, Gerhard Abstreiter

Franz Josef Gießibl (born 27 May 1962 in Amerang) is a German physicist and university professor at the University of Regensburg.

== Career ==
Giessibl studied physics from 1982 to 1987 at the Technical University of Munich and at Eidgenössische Technischen Hochschule Zürich. He received a diploma in experimental physics in 1988 under Professor Gerhard Abstreiter and continued with a PhD in physics with Gerd Binnig on atomic force microscopy (AFM).

He joined the faculty at the Department of Physics at University of Regensburg in 2006.

Continuing his work on AFM, he and colleagues achieved subatomic spatial resolution in the 2000s. He invented qPlus, a type of sensor for non-contact atomic force microscopy based on a quartz cantilever.

== Personal life ==
Franz Giessibl is married and has two sons.

== Books ==
1. "Noncontact Atomic Force Microscopy". NanoScience and Technology. Berlin, Heidelberg: Springer Berlin Heidelberg. 2009. doi:10.1007/978-3-642-01495-6. ISBN 978-3-642-01494-9. ISSN 1434-4904.
2. "Noncontact Atomic Force Microscopy". NanoScience and Technology. Cham: Springer International Publishing. 2015. doi:10.1007/978-3-319-15588-3. hdl:11693/50865. ISBN 978-3-319-15587-6. ISSN 1434-4904. S2CID 92873134.
3. Gießibl, Franz J. (4 February 2022). Erster Blick in das Innere eines Atoms - Begegnungen mit Gerhard Richter zwischen Kunst und Wissenschaft (in German). Verlag der Buchhandlung Walther und Franz König. ISBN 978-3-7533-0174-7.
4. Gießibl, Franz J. (8 February 2022). First View Inside an Atom: Encounters with Gerhard Richter Between Art and Science. Walther Konig Verlag. ISBN 978-3-7533-0188-4.
5. Giessibl, Franz J. (16 September 2026). Atomic Force Microscopy and Atomic Manipulation. An Inquiry into Matter. Springer. ISBN 978-3-032-32201-2.

== Awards and honors ==
- 2000: Deutscher Nanowissenschaftspreis
- 2001: Rudolf-Kaiser-Preis
- 2009: Karl Heinz Beckurts-Preis
- 2014: Joseph F. Keithley Award For Advances in Measurement Science of the American Physical Society
- 2015: Rudolf-Jaeckel Prize of the German Vacuum Society
- 2016: Foresight Institute Feynman Prize in Nanotechnology
- 2023: Innovation in Materials Characterization Award of the Materials Research Society (USA) and fellow of the American Physical Society (USA)
- 2024: Heinrich Rohrer Medal, National Institute for Materials Science award, International Fellow of Japan Society of Vacuum and Surface Science (JVSS)
- 2025: Member of European Academy of Sciences and Art (EASA), Fellow of European Academy of Sciences (EurASc)
- 2026: Distinguished Fellow of International Engineering and Technology Institute (IETI)

== Selected lectures ==
- Ehrenfest Kolloquium Leiden (Netherlands, 27 October 2010)
- Zernike Kolloquium Groningen (Netherlands, 2013)
- Erster Blick in das Innere eines Atoms. Begegungen mit Gerhard Richter zwischen Kunst und Wissenschaft, Waldhaus Sils, Schweiz (19 March 2023)
- Scanning probe microscopy with qPlus sensors, Distinguished Colloquium Peking University, (China, 19 July 2024)
- Seeing Dents in the Atom, Plenary talk at the Spring Meeting of the German Physical Society, Section Condensed Matter, University of Regensburg, (17 March 2025)
