= Advanced Technologies Center =

Companies based in Moscow, Russia

- Company type: Joint-stock
- Founded: 1990; 36 years ago
- Headquarters: Moscow
- Products: Scanning Probe Microscopes; Image Processing Software
- Website: webcite

Advanced Technologies Center (ATC) is a company established on September 12, 1990, in Moscow (Russian Federation) by Igor Yaminsky (professor of Moscow State University). The company focuses on engineering, development and production of precision instrumentation for research ar micro- and nano- meter scale. The company is one of the pioneers on the atomic force microscopy market in Russia. The most well-known ATC product in Russia and abroad, is FemtoScan scanning probe microscope and FemtoScan Online software.
