= Gerhard Abstreiter =

German physicist

- Awards: Max Born Medal and Prize
- Scientific career
- Institutions: Technical University of Munich, University of California, Santa Barbara
- Notable students: Franz Josef Giessibl

Gerhard Abstreiter is a German physicist and professor of physics at Technical University of Munich (TUM), currently holding the university's highest honor, the Emeritus of Excellence and also being a distinguished visiting professor at University of California, Santa Barbara. From 1987 to 2015, he was a full professor at TUM and also, in 2010 and 2011, a distinguished visiting professor at University of Tokyo. He is a Fellow of the American Physical Society, Bavarian Academy of Sciences and Humanities and acatech.

He won the Max Born Medal and Prize in 1998.
