= Andreas J. Heinrich =

German physicist

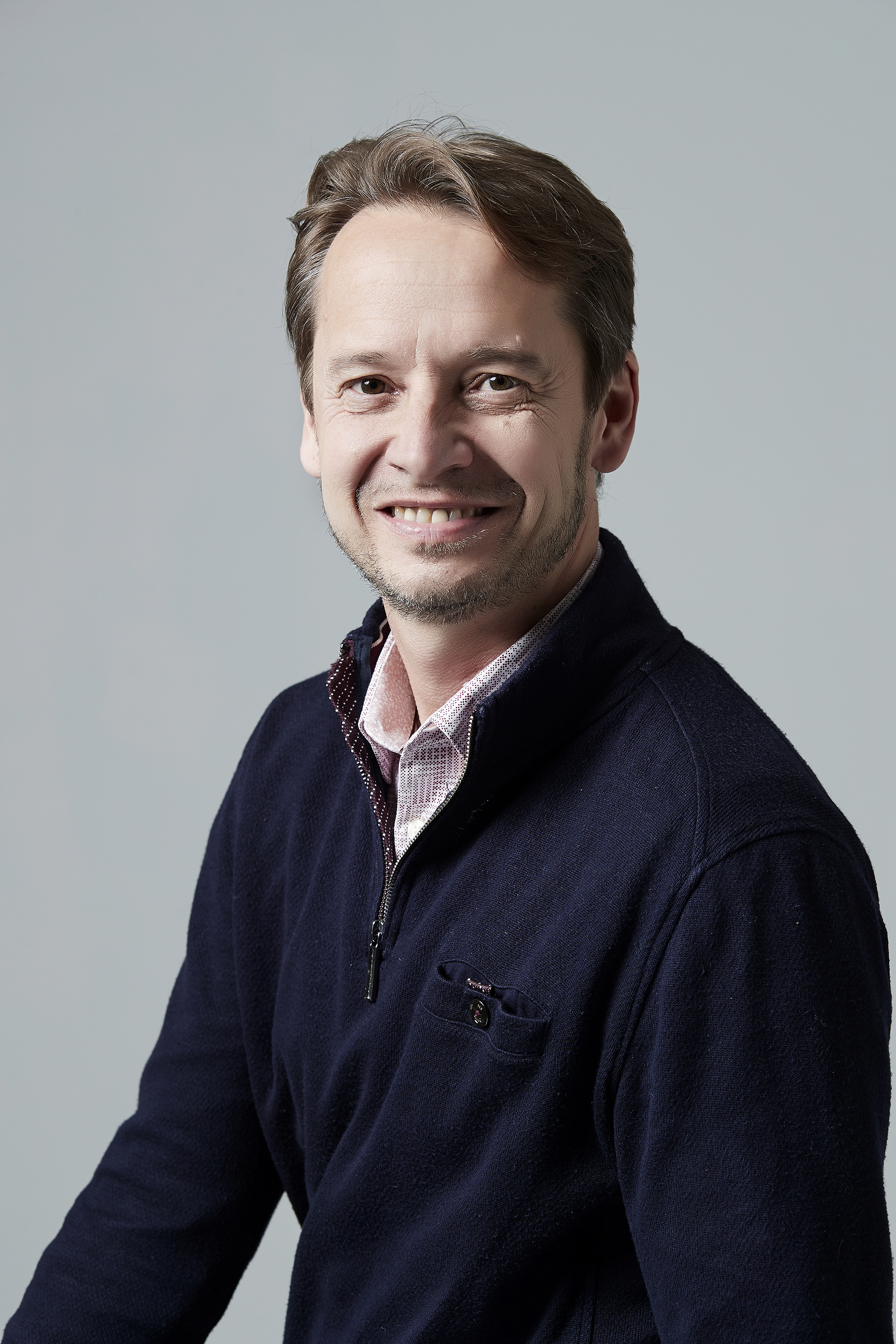
- Heinrich in 2019
- Born: Kassel, Germany
- Citizenship: Germany
- Education: University of Göttingen
- Known for: Nanosecond scanning tunneling microscopy, spin excitation spectroscopy, precise atom manipulation, A Boy and His Atom
- Awards: Heinrich Rohrer Medal (2020), Feynman Prize in Nanotechnology (2018), Joseph F. Keithley Award For Advances in Measurement Science (2018)
- Scientific career
- Fields: Scanning tunneling microscope, quantum technology, nanoscience
- Workplaces: Center for Quantum Nanoscience, Institute for Basic Science; Ewha Womans University; IBM Research - Almaden
- Website: IBS Center for Quantum Nanoscience

Andreas J. Heinrich is a physicist working with scanning tunneling microscopy, quantum technology, nanoscience, spin excitation spectroscopy, and precise atom manipulation. He worked for IBM Research in Almaden for 18 years, during which time he developed nanosecond scanning tunneling microscopy which provided an improvement in time resolution of 100,000 times, and combined x-ray absorption spectroscopy with spin excitation spectroscopy. In 2015 his team combined STM with electron spin resonance, which enables single-atom measurements on spins with nano-electronvolt precision REF1, REF2. In 2022 his team demonstrated the extension of ESR-STM to individual molecules REF3. Heinrich was also principal investigator of the stop-motion animated short film A Boy and His Atom filmed by moving thousands of individual atoms. He is a fellow of the American Physical Society and the American Association for the Advancement of Science and the recipient of the Heinrich Rohrer Medal (Grand Medal) of the Japan Society of Vacuum and Surface Science.

In 2016, he became a distinguished professor at Ewha Womans University in Seoul, Republic of Korea and the founding director of the Institute for Basic Science (IBS) Center for Quantum Nanoscience. Groundbreaking for the research center's Research Cooperation Building occurred in 2018 and it was opened in 2019 during the IBS Conference on Quantum Nanoscience.
The QNS building features some of the lowest vibration levels for STM labs in the world REF4. QNS is engineering the quantum future by investigating the scientific foundations of quantum-coherent systems at the nanoscale REF5 with a particular focus on spins on surfaces REF6.

== Education ==
He received his Masters (Diplom) and PhD in physics in 1994 and 1998, respectively, from the University of Göttingen, Germany. He was a research assistant from 1994 to 1998 under supervision of R. G. Ulbrich. After obtaining a PhD, he was a postdoc at IBM Almaden with Kavli Prize laureate Don Eigler until 2001, in which Heinrich was hired as a researcher/engineer.

== Career ==
Desiring to leave Göttingen and with a goal to work in IBM's Almaden Research Center, he received a scholarship from the Alexander von Humboldt Foundation to finance his move. The German magazine Stern categorized Heinrich's move overseas as part of Germany's "brain drain". After working in IBM Almaden for several years, he became a group leader on magnetic nanostructures on surfaces and scanning probe microscopy in 2005 where he worked until 2016. In 2012, he became a Fellow of the American Physics Society for the development of spin excitation spectroscopy and nanosecond STM. From 2012, he has been serving on the Scientific Advisory Board of Max Planck Institute for Solid State Research in Stuttgart, Germany.

While exploring the limits of data storage, his team made A Boy and His Atom; the World's Smallest Stop-Motion Film as recognized by the Guinness Book of World Records. Their research showed that data storage could shrink from a standard of one million atoms, down to twelve. Less than five years later, the team Heinrich was on reduced this number to a single atom. The Korean Ministry of Science and ICT deemed this research result one of the most substantial domestic outcomes of that year.

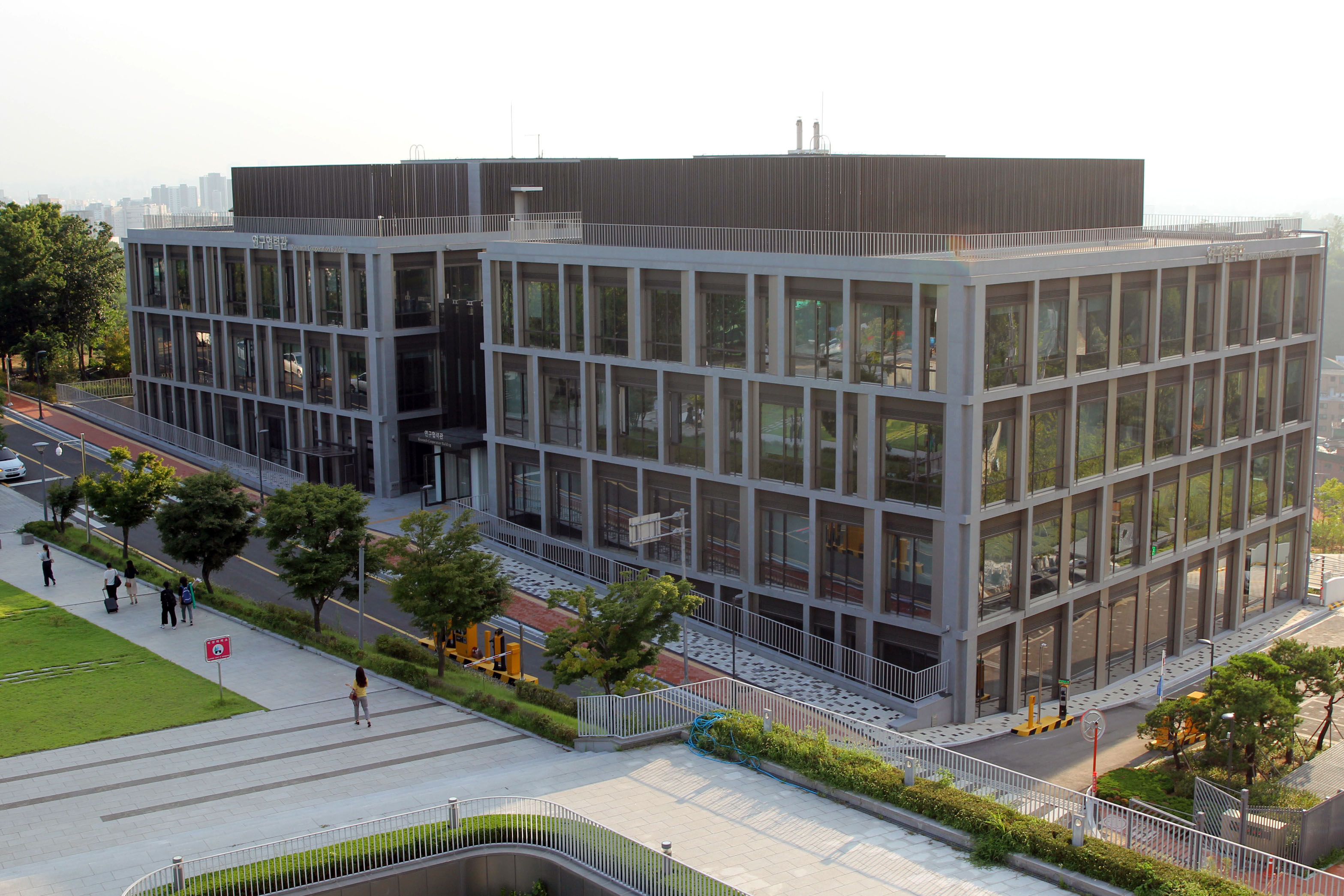
The Research Cooperation Building houses the Center for Quantum Nanoscience on the Ewha Womans University campus.

He moved to South Korea to become a distinguished professor at Ewha Womans University and director of the Institute for Basic Science Center for Quantum Nanoscience in 2016. One of the long-term goals for the center is to fully control the quantum states of molecules and atoms on clean surfaces and near interfaces which would enable the use of high-sensitivity quantum sensors. Working in collaboration with IBM Almaden, they were able to perform MRI scans on individual atoms.

== Honors and awards ==
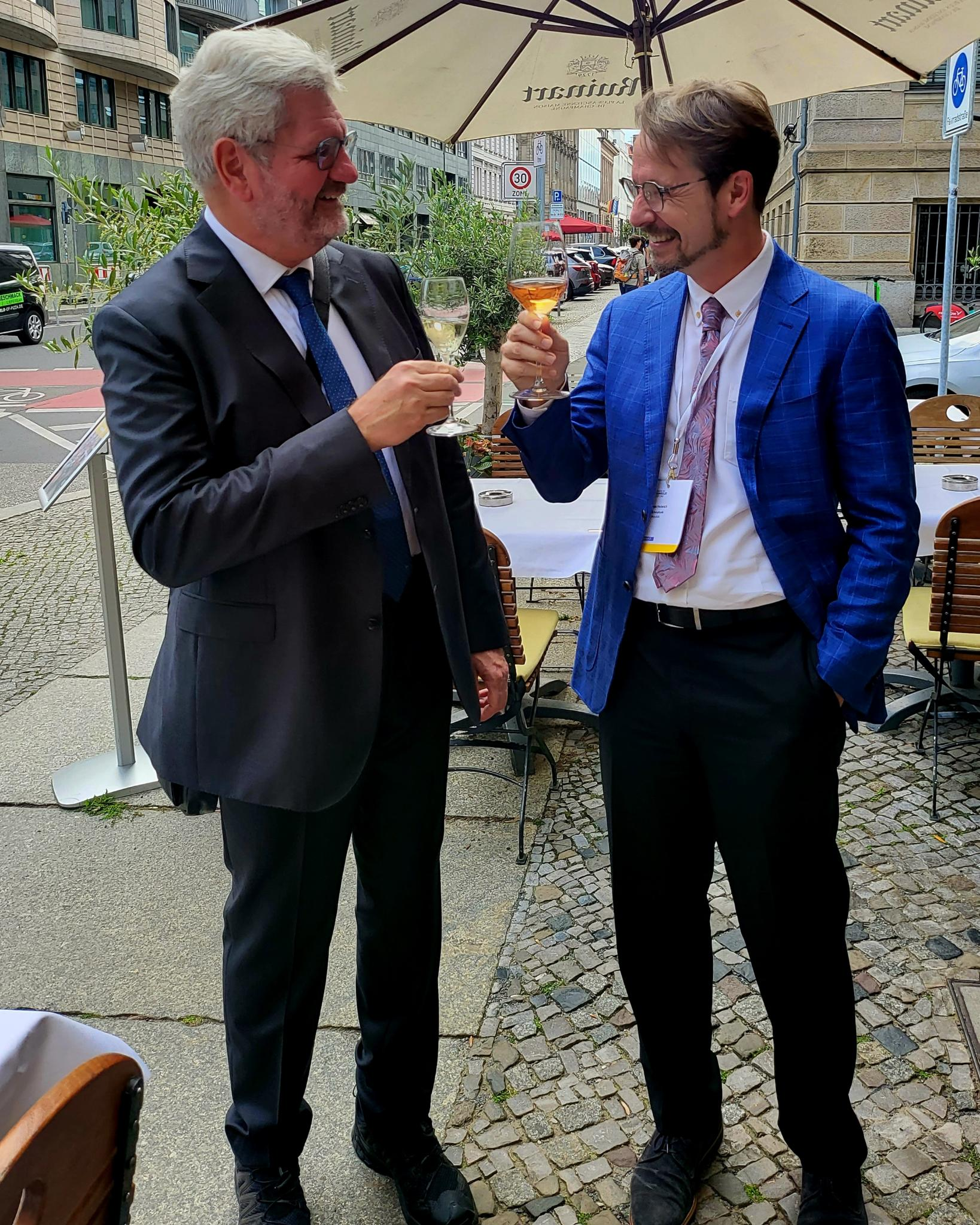
Robert Schlögl (left) and Andreas J. Heinrich (right) during the awarding of the 2023 Humboldt Prize in Germany.

- 2025: Presidential Citation, 58th Science Day Commemorative Government Award
- 2024: Honorary citizen of Seoul
- 2023: Humboldt Research Award
- 2021: Karl Friedrich Bonhoeffer Lecture Award
- 2020: Heinrich Rohrer Medal
- 2018: Outstanding National R&D Performances in 2018 (국가연구개발 우수성과 100선), Ministry of Science and ICT
- 2018: Foresight Institute Feynman Prize in Nanotechnology
- 2018: Joseph F. Keithley Award For Advances in Measurement Science
- 2016: Distinguished Fellowship from the Chinese Academy of Sciences President's International Fellowship Initiative (PIFI)
- 2015: Fellow of the American Association for the Advancement of Science
- 2014: Outstanding Technical Achievement Award, IBM
- 2012: Fellow of the American Physics Society
- 2011: Best of IBM Award
- 2011: Corporate Award, IBM
- 2010: Outstanding Technical Achievement Award, IBM
- 2007: Outstanding Innovation Award, IBM
- 2003: Research Division Award, IBM
- 1998: Feodor Lynen scholarship, Alexander von Humboldt Foundation, Germany

== See also ==
- Michael F. Crommie
- Wolf-Dieter Schneider
- Eberhard Umbach
