= Fluidic force microscopy =

Fluidic force microscopy (FluidFM) is a type of scanning probe microscopy, and is typically used on a standard inverted light microscope.

The unique characteristic of FluidFM is that it introduces microscopic channels into AFM probes. Those channels can have an aperture of less than 300 nm, or 500 times thinner than a human hair. This nanometric features enables the handling of liquid volumes at the femtoliter (fL) scale as well as force controlled manipulations of sub-micron objects. Via the nanofluidic channels, substances can for example be inserted into single cells or cells can be isolated from a confluent layer.

== Technology ==
Special micropipettes and nanopipettes are used as FluidFM probes with openings between 300 nm and 8 μm. A larger diameter is helpful for single cell adhesion experiments, whereas a smaller diameter provides good opportunities for nanolithography and handling of sub-micron objects. Compared to the traditional glass micropipettes FluidFM probes are much more gentle to soft samples such as cells. They can be controlled with pN and nm precision, and handle volumes more precise and consistent due to their wafer-based fabrication process. FluidFM has unique advantages for single cell applications and beyond.

To control volumes in the fL range FluidFM relies on pressure control. Either overpressure or vacuum is used, depending on the application. Typical operating pressures are in the range of a few hPa.

The FluidFM technology is typically used on top of an inverted microscope. In addition to standard AFM experiments, FluidFM provides the possibility to perform countless other applications, such as single cell injection and adhesion as well as nanolithography and spotting.

== Applications ==
Single cell injection is an important tool for life sciences, biology and medicine. To perform single cell injection experiments, the probe pierces the cell and a substance can be injected. With FluidFM the success rate is almost 100%, in contrast to other methods, because the probes are small, sharp and force sensitive.

A single cell can be isolated either from an adherent, even confluent cell culture or a cell suspension. The isolated cell can then be analysed by established single cell methods or be used to grow a new colony. FluidFM has been used to isolate mammalian cells, yeast and bacteria.

By measuring the adhesion of single cells, important information for different topics in biology and materialscience can be obtained. With FluidFM it is possible to increase the rate in which these experiments can be performed, and even to assess the adhesion of spread cells. The cell of interest is reversibly attached to the probe by applying an underpressure. By raising the probe, the force of the adhesion can be measured with pN resolution.

The method to perform a single bacteria adhesion experiment is the same as for single cells. It provides information about how bacterial cells interact with their surface and with each other.

Colloidal experiments give the opportunity to measure interaction forces between colloidal particles and surfaces as well as the local elasticity of complex substrates. The rate in which these experiments can be performed is rather low because normally colloids have to be pre-glued on an AFM probe. In contrast, the colloid probes can be reversibly attached to the FluidFM probe by underpressure. Therefore, one probe can be used for many experiments and many colloids.

Nanolithography is the process of etching, writing or printing structures in the range of nanometer. Small amounts of fluids can be dispensed via the tip of a probe. With FluidFM the dispensed volumes of sub fL to many pL. FluidFM operates both in air and liquid.

Spotting is the process of printing spots and high density arrays in the range of nanometer to single micrometer. It is possible to print almost any liquid. Printed particles can for example be oligonucleotides, proteins, DNA, virions or bacterial clones. The spots are created when the nanopipette makes contact with the surface and the substance is released of the probe with a short pressure pulse.
