= Scanning voltage microscopy =

Scientific experimental technique

Scanning voltage microscopy (SVM), sometimes also called nanopotentiometry, is a scientific experimental technique based on atomic force microscopy. A conductive probe, usually only a few nanometers wide at the tip, is placed in full contact with an operational electronic or optoelectronic sample. By connecting the probe to a high-impedance voltmeter and rastering over the sample's surface, a map of the electric potential can be acquired. SVM is generally nondestructive to the sample although some damage may occur to the sample or the probe if the pressure required to maintain good electrical contact is too high. If the input impedance of the voltmeter is sufficiently large, the SVM probe should not perturb the operation of the operational sample.

== Applications ==
SVM is particularly well suited to analyzing microelectronic devices (such as transistors or diodes) or quantum electronic devices (such as quantum well diode lasers) directly because nanometer spatial resolution is possible. SVM can also be used to verify theoretical simulation of complex electronic devices.

For example, the potential profile across the quantum well structure of a diode laser can be mapped and analyzed; such a profile could indicate the electron and hole distributions where light is generated and could lead to improved laser designs.

== Scanning gate microscopy ==
In scanning gate microscopy (SGM)), a related technique, the probe is oscillated at its natural frequency at a fixed distance above the sample with a voltage applied relative to the sample. The image is generated from the X–Y position of the probe and the conductance of the sample, with no significant current passing through the probe, which functions as a local gate. The resulting image is interpreted as a map of the sample's sensitivity to gate voltage. A lock-in amplifier reduces noise by filtering only the amplitude oscillations that match the probe's vibration frequency. Applications include imaging defect sites in carbon nanotubes nanotubes and doping profiles in nanowires.
