= Roland Wiesendanger =

German physicist

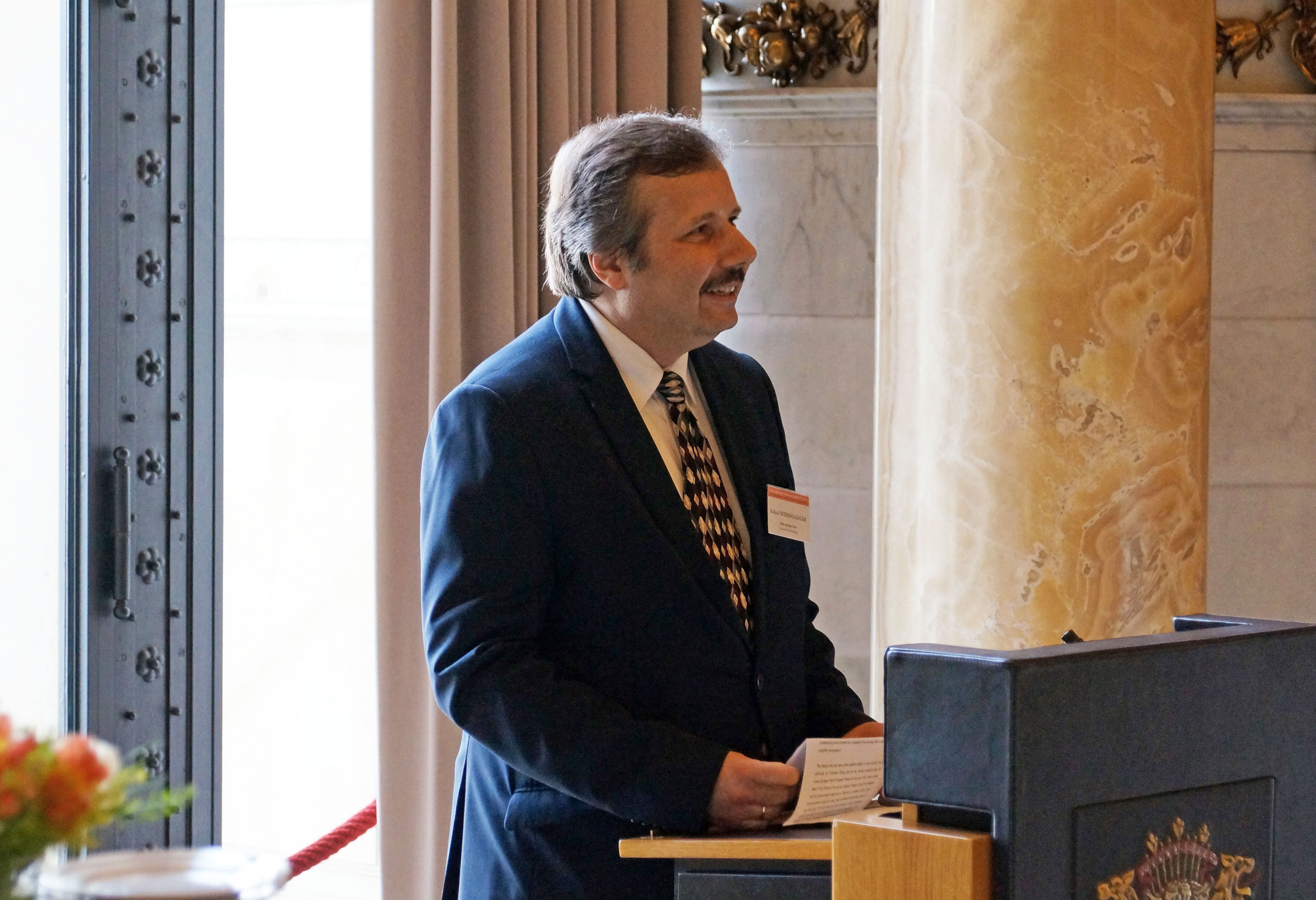
Roland Wiesendanger during the awarding of the Julius Springer Prize 2016

Roland Wiesendanger (born 5 October 1961 in Basel) is a German physicist, specializing in nanoscience. Since 1993 he has been a full professor at the University of Hamburg, Germany.

He has been awarded three times in a row with the ERC Advanced Grant of the European Research Council as first scientist in Europe.

== Early life and education ==
According to the CV published on his department website, Wiesendanger was born in Basel.

He grew up in Lörrach, Germany, where he attended high-school, the Hans-Thoma-Gymnasium from 1972 to 1981. He started studying physics, mathematics, and astronomy at the University of Basel, Switzerland in 1981. Since 1984 he had been working in the field of scanning tunneling microscopy. In 1986, he graduated in physics with highest distinction and in 1987, he received his PhD with "summa cum laude" in experimental physics for his work on "Scanning Tunneling Microscopy on Non-Crystalline Solids".

== Career ==
Until his Habilitation degree in 1990, he set up a unique Surface Science Instrument ("NANOLAB-I") which allowed for the simultaneous investigation of the structure, electronic and magnetic properties of surfaces at the atomic scale.

In 1992 Wiesendanger received an offer for a full professor position for Experimental Physics at the University of Hamburg, connected with the Foundation of the Microstructure Advanced Research Center Hamburg. He established a National Center of Competence in Nanotechnology.

== Work ==
Wiesendanger is author or co-author of more than 600 scientific publications as well as several books.

In February 2021, he released a working paper and preprint, non-peer-reviewed publication suggesting that SARS-CoV-2 had escaped from a lab in Wuhan, a story which was picked up by many German news services including TV. Wiesendanger himself does not see his "study" as a formal scientific publication, but it "is intended to serve as information for a broad public in Germany".

== Memberships and service ==
Since 2000 Wiesendanger is a member of the National Academy Leopoldina, since 2005 member of the Academy of Sciences in Hamburg, and since 2008 member of the German Academy of Science and Engineering (acatech). In 2012 he became Honorary Professor of the Harbin Institute of Technology (China) and in 2015 he received an Honorary Doctor degree from the Poznań University of Technology (Poland).

He has organized numerous international conferences like the International Scanning Tunneling Microscopy (STM’97) Conference in Hamburg (1997) or the 1st Otto Stern Symposium in Hamburg (2013). He has been a speaker at more than 500 international conferences, workshops and colloquia worldwide.

== Selected awards and honors ==
- 1992: Gaede-Prize of the German Vacuum Society
- 1992: Max Auwärter Prize
- 1999: Karl Heinz Beckurts-Prize
- 2000: Member of the National Academy Leopoldina
- 2003: Philip Morris Research Prize
- 2005: Member of the Academy of Sciences and Humanities in Hamburg
- 2008: Member of the German Academy of Science and Engineering (acatech)
- 2008: 1st ERC Advanced Grant
- 2010: Nanotechnology Recognition Award of the American Vacuum Society
- 2012: Fellow of the American Vacuum Society
- 2012: Honorary Professor of the Harbin Institute of Technology, China
- 2013: Foreign Member of the Polish Academy of Sciences
- 2013: 2nd ERC Advanced Grant
- 2014: Heinrich Rohrer Grand Medal
- 2015: Honorary Doctor of the Poznań University of Technology, Poland
- 2015: Hamburg Science Prize
- 2015: International Fellow of the Surface Science Society of Japan
- 2016: Julius Springer Prize for Applied Physics
- 2018: 3rd ERC Advanced Grant
- 2019: Honorary Medal „De Scientia et Humanitate Optime Meritis" of the Czech Academy of Sciences
