= Center for Quantum Nanoscience =

South Korean research center

Coordinates: 37°33′42.72″N 126°56′48.60″E

IBS Center for Quantum Nanoscience (QNS)
- 양자나노과학 연구단
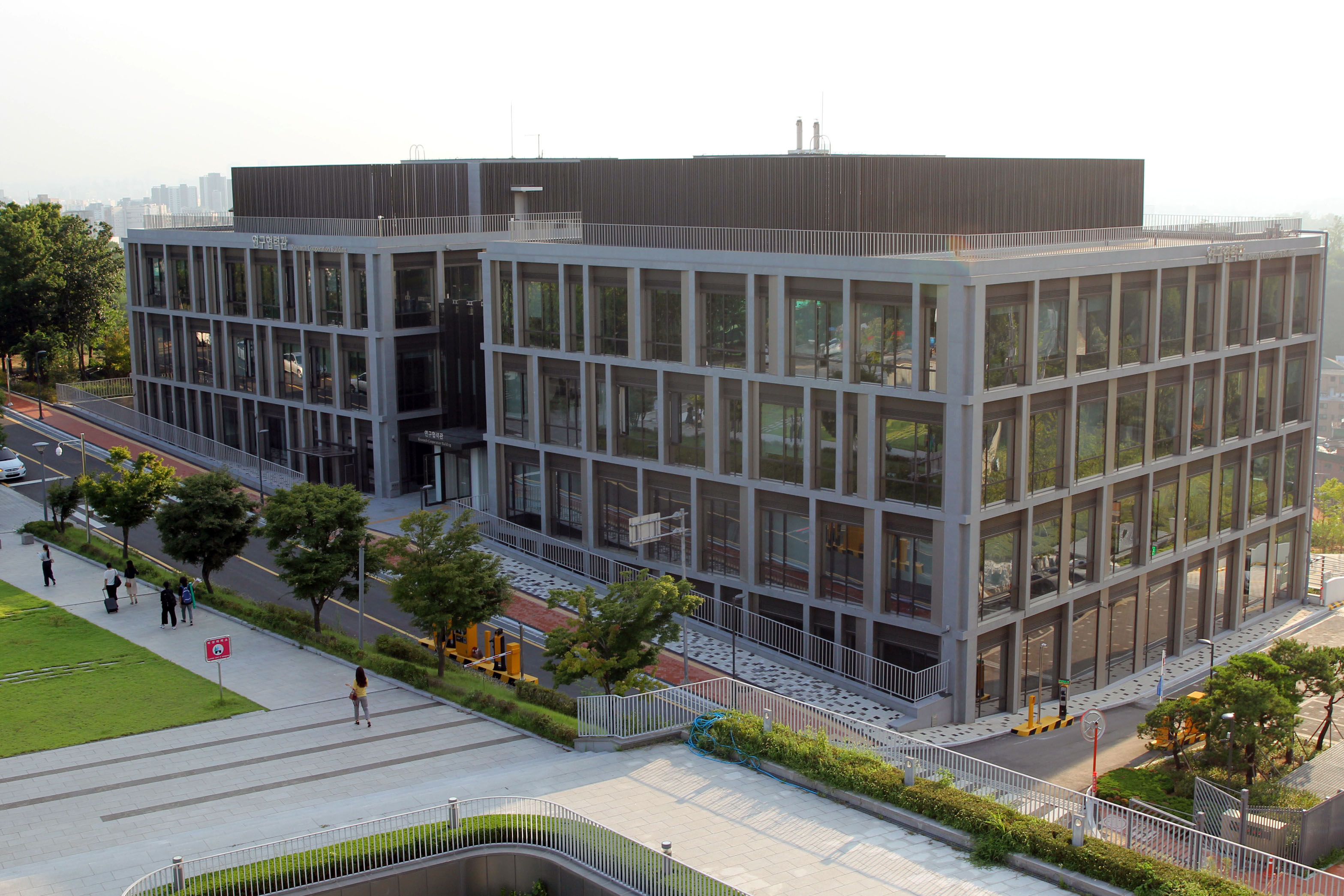
- Established: 1 January 2017; 9 years ago
- Research type: Basic science
- Field of research: Quantum nanoscience, scanning tunneling microscope, quantum technology, nanoscience
- Director: Andreas J. Heinrich
- Location: 52 Ewhayeodae-gil, Daehyeon-dong, Seodaemun-gu, Seoul, 03760, South Korea
- Campus: Ewha Womans University
- Operating agency: Institute for Basic Science
- Website: qns.science

- Center for Quantum Nanoscience
- Hangul: 양자나노과학 연구단
- Hanja: 量子나노科學 硏究團
- RR: Yangja nano gwahak yeongudan
- MR: Yangja nano kwahak yŏn'gudan

The Center for Quantum Nanoscience was founded in 2017 as part of efforts for South Korea to expand basic science research. Classified as an Extramural Center of the Institute for Basic Science, it is hosted by Ewha Womans University in Seoul, South Korea. Their research focuses on exploring quantum properties of atoms and molecules on surfaces and interfaces and long-term goals of quantum sensing and quantum computation in those areas.

Their dedicated building started construction in 2018 and officially opened in 2019 during the IBS Conference on Quantum Nanoscience. In 2020, the Research Cooperation Building received the Excellence Prize of the 2020 Korean Architecture Award. The center received the highest grade possible in the 5th year performance evaluation.

== Research results ==
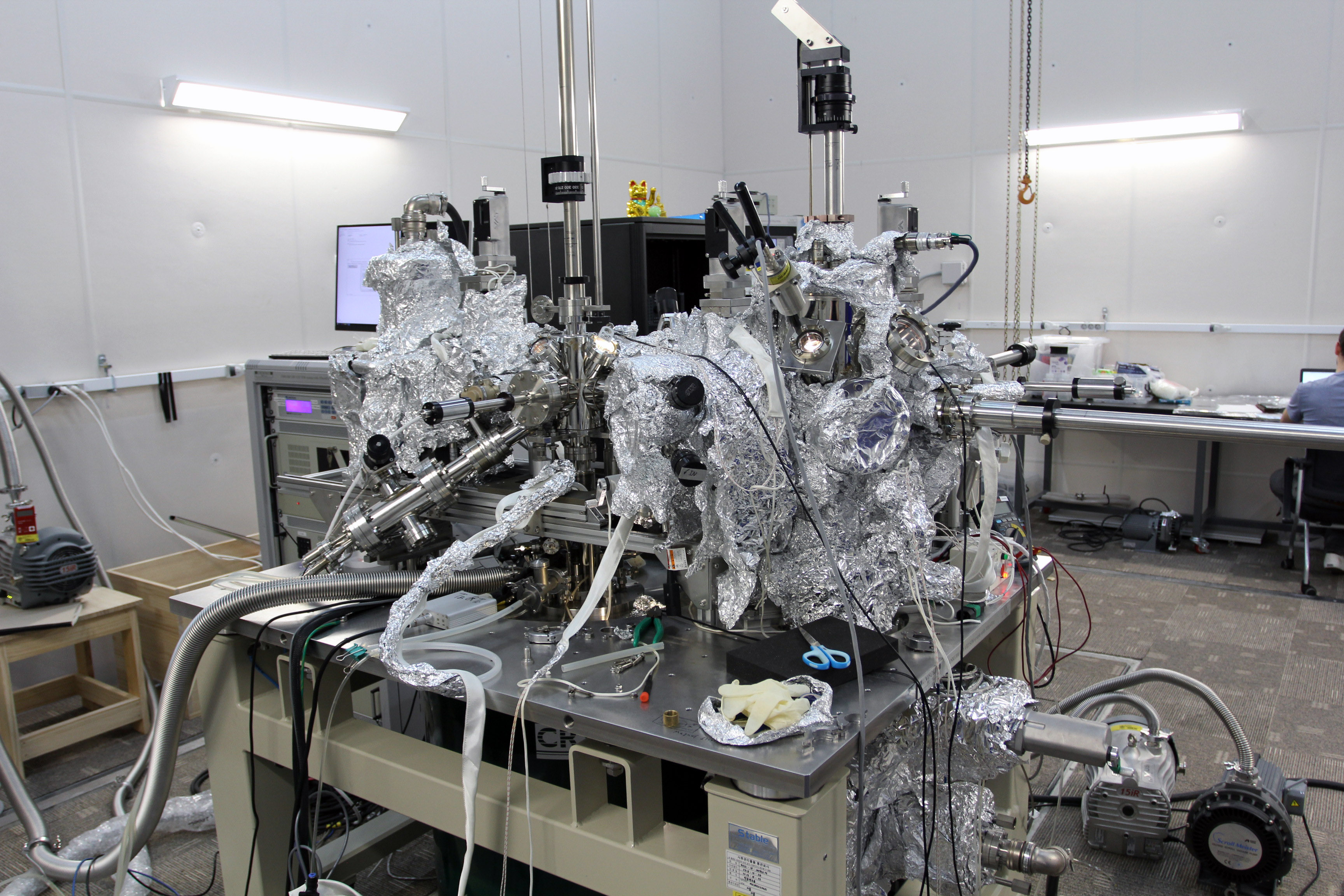
This low-temperature ESR-STM is one of the first STMs globally to measure electron spin resonance on single atoms.

Within two years of their founding, several published outcomes indicate growing leadership in the exploding field of quantum nanoscience. For example, they reduced digital memory down to a single holmium atom on MgO substrate using a scanning tunneling microscope. At time of their publishing, commercially available magnetic memory devices require approximately one million atoms to record the same amount of data. This storage miniaturization has additional potential to serve as the basis of quantum computing. Researchers also coupled atom's nuclear spin and its electron counterpart, which resulted in measuring the nuclear spin of single atoms of iron and titanium with an improvement of energy resolution by a fact of 10,000. This level of control could lead to a computational base unit of quantum computing.

Working in collaboration with IBM Almaden, they were able to perform MRI scans on individual atoms.

== Research directions and goals ==
The center has stated their desire to achieve full control of quantum states of atoms and molecules on clean surfaces and near interfaces which would allow usage of high-sensitivity quantum sensors and the usage of single atoms and molecules as quantum bits for computation applications. Another goal is to create a theoretical framework on how the quantum properties of atoms and molecules change from gas to solid-state environments and their interactions with conduction electrons and understand the transition from coherent quantum to more classical systems while in solid-state environment.

The research center also hosted the first international conference on quantum nanoscience in Seoul in 2019.

== Awards ==
- 2018: American Physical Society, Joseph F. Keithley Award For Advances in Measurement Science for Advances in Measurement Science
- 2018: Foresight Institute Feynman Prize: For advances in manipulating atoms and small molecules on surfaces and employing them for data storage and computation
- 2018: Outstanding National R&D Performances in 2018 (국가연구개발 우수성과 100선), Ministry of Science and ICT
- 2018: Max-Auwaerter Award, Austrian Physical Society - Fabio Donati

== See also ==
- Kuk Young, former team leader
- Centre for Quantum Technologies
- Michelle Simmons, director of the Centre of Excellence for Quantum Computer Technology
