= Gerd Binnig =

German physicist (born 1947)

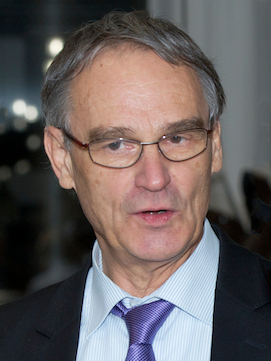
- Binnig in 2013
- Born: 20 July 1947 (age 79); Frankfurt am Main, Germany
- Education: Goethe University Frankfurt
- Known for: Scanning tunneling microscope Scanning probe microscopy Atomic force microscope
- Awards: Klung Wilhelmy Science Award (1983); EPS Europhysics Prize (1984); King Faisal Prize (1984); Nobel Prize in Physics (1986); The Elliott Cresson Medal (1987); Kavli Prize (2016)
- Scientific career
- Fields: Physics
- Workplaces: IBM Zurich Research Laboratory
- Doctoral advisor: Werner Martienssen; Eckhardt Hoenig
- Doctoral students: Franz Josef Giessibl

Gerd Karl Binnig (German pronunciation: [ˈɡɛʁt ˈbɪnɪç]; born 20 July 1947) is a German physicist. He is most famous for having won the Nobel Prize in Physics jointly with Heinrich Rohrer in 1986 for the invention of the scanning tunneling microscope.

== Early life and education ==
Binnig was born in Frankfurt am Main and played in the ruins of the city during his childhood. His family lived partly in Frankfurt and partly in Offenbach am Main, and he attended school in both cities. At the age of 10, he decided to become a physicist, but he soon wondered whether he had made the right choice. He concentrated more on music, playing in a band. He also started playing the violin at 15 and played in his school orchestra.

Binnig studied physics at the Goethe University Frankfurt, gaining a bachelor's degree in 1973 and remaining there to do a PhD within Werner Martienssen's group, supervised by Eckhardt Hoenig. He received his PhD in 1978.

== Career ==
In 1978, Binnig accepted an offer from IBM to join their Zurich research group, where he worked with Heinrich Rohrer, Christoph Gerber and Edmund Weibel. There they developed the scanning tunneling microscope (STM), an instrument for imaging surfaces at the atomic level. The Nobel committee described the effect that the invention of the STM had on science, saying that "entirely new fields are opening up for the study of the structure of matter." The physical principles on which the STM was based were already known before the IBM team developed the STM, but Binnig and his colleagues were the first to solve the significant experimental challenges involved in putting it into effect.

The IBM Zurich team were soon recognized with a number of prizes: the German Physics Prize, the Otto Klung Prize, the Hewlett Packard Prize and the King Faisal Prize. In 1986, Binnig and Rohrer shared half of the Nobel Prize in Physics, the other half of the Prize was awarded to Ernst Ruska.

From 1985 to 1988, he worked in California. He was at IBM in Almaden Valley, and was visiting professor at Stanford University.

In 1985, Binnig invented the atomic force microscope (AFM) and Binnig, Christoph Gerber and Calvin Quate went on to develop a working version of this new microscope for insulating surfaces.

In 1987 Binnig was appointed IBM Fellow. In the same year, he started the IBM Physics group Munich, working on creativity and atomic force microscopy.

In 1994 Professor Gerd Binnig founded Definiens which turned in the year 2000 into a commercial enterprise. The company developed Cognition Network Technology to analyze images just like the human eye and brain are capable of doing.

in 2016, Binnig won the Kavli Prize in Nanoscience. He became a fellow of the Norwegian Academy of Science and Letters.

The Binnig and Rohrer Nanotechnology Center, an IBM-owned research facility in Rüschlikon, Zurich is named after Gerd Binnig and Heinrich Rohrer.

== Personal life ==
In 1969, Binnig married Lore Wagler, a psychologist, and they have a daughter born in Switzerland and a son born in California. His hobbies include reading, swimming, and golf.
