= Heinrich Rohrer =

Swiss physicist (1933–2013)

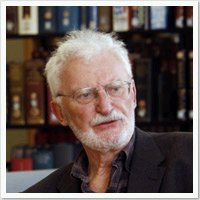
- Heinrich Rohrer in 2008
- Born: 6 June 1933; Buchs, St. Gallen, Switzerland
- Died: 16 May 2013 (aged 79); Wollerau, Switzerland
- Known for: Scanning tunneling microscope; Scanning probe microscopy
- Scientific career
- Fields: Physics
- Workplaces: Tohoku University

Heinrich Rohrer (6 June 1933 – 16 May 2013) was a Swiss physicist who shared half of the 1986 Nobel Prize in Physics with Gerd Binnig for the design of the scanning tunneling microscope (STM). The other half of the Prize was awarded to Ernst Ruska. The Heinrich Rohrer Medal is presented triennially by the Surface Science Society of Japan with IBM Research – Zurich, Swiss Embassy in Japan, and Ms. Rohrer in his memory. The medal is not to be confused with the Heinrich Rohrer Award presented at the Nano Seoul 2020 conference.

== Biography ==
Heinrich Rohrer was born on 6 June 1933 in Buchs, St. Gallen, half an hour after his twin sister. He enjoyed a carefree country childhood until the family moved to Zürich in 1949. He enrolled in the Swiss Federal Institute of Technology (ETH) in 1951, where he was student of Wolfgang Pauli and Paul Scherrer. His PhD thesis was supervised by P. Grassmann who worked on cryogenic engineering. Rohrer measured the length changes of superconductors at the magnetic-field-induced superconducting transition, a project begun by Jørgen Lykke Olsen. In the course of his research, he found that he had to do most of his research at night after the city was asleep because his measurements were so sensitive to vibration.

His studies were interrupted by his military service in the Swiss mountain infantry. In 1961, he married Rose-Marie Egger. Their honeymoon trip to the United States included a stint doing research on thermal conductivity of type-II superconductors and metals with Bernie Serin at Rutgers University in New Jersey.

In 1963, he joined the IBM Research Laboratory in Rüschlikon under the direction of Ambros Speiser. The first couple of years at IBM, he studied Kondo systems with magnetoresistance in pulsed magnetic fields. He then began studying magnetic phase diagrams, which eventually brought him into the field of critical phenomena.

In 1974, he spent a sabbatical year at the University of California, Santa Barbara studying nuclear magnetic resonance with Vince Jaccarino and Alan King.

Until 1982 he worked on the scanning tunneling microscope. He was appointed IBM Fellow in 1986, and led the physics department of the research lab from 1986 until 1988. Rohrer was elected as an honourable member of the Swiss Physical Society in 1990 and an honorary academician of Academia Sinica in 2008.

Rohrer died of natural causes on 16 May 2013 at his home in Wollerau, Switzerland, aged 79.
