= Jaguar (software) =

- Developer(s): Schrödinger Inc.
- Operating system: Linux, Microsoft Windows, Mac OS X
- Type: Computational Chemistry
- License: Commercial
- Website: https://www.schrodinger.com/jaguar

Jaguar is a computer software package used for ab initio quantum chemistry calculations for both gas and solution phases. It is commercial software marketed by the company Schrödinger. The program was originated in research groups of Richard Friesner and William Goddard and was initially called PS-GVB (referring to the so-called pseudospectral generalized valence bond method that the program featured).

Jaguar is a component of two other Schrödinger products: Maestro, which provides the graphical user interface to Jaguar, and a QM/MM program QSite, which uses Jaguar as its quantum-chemical engine. The current version is Jaguar 10.4 (2020).

== Features ==
A distinctive feature of Jaguar is its use of the pseudospectral approximation. This approximation can be applied to computationally expensive integral operations present in most quantum chemical calculations. As a result, calculations are faster with little loss in accuracy.

The current version includes the following functionality:

- Hartree–Fock (RHF, UHF, ROHF) and density functional theory (LDA, gradient-corrected, dispersion-corrected, and hybrid functionals)
- local second-order Møller–Plesset perturbation theory (LMP2)
- generalized valence bond perfect-pairing (GVB-PP) and GVB-LMP2 calculations
- prediction of excited states using configuration interaction (CIS) and time-dependent density functional theory (TDDFT)
- geometry optimization and transition state search
- solvation calculations based on the Poisson–Boltzmann equation
- prediction of infrared (IR), nuclear magnetic resonance (NMR), ultraviolet (UV), and vibrational circular dichroism (VCD) spectra
- pKa prediction
- generation of various molecular surfaces (electrostatic potential, electron density, molecular orbitals etc.)
- prediction of various molecular properties (multipole moments, polarizabilities, vibrational frequencies etc.)

== See also ==
- Quantum chemistry computer programs
