= Alessandra Ricca =

SETI astrochemist

Alessandra Ricca is a computational chemist whose research focuses primarily on theoretical chemistry. She researches modelling properties of organic compounds in the gas and ice phases, emphasizing the formation, reactivity, spectroscopy, and optical properties of the researched compounds. In Astrophysics and Analysis at NASA, Ricca studies PAH infrared spectroscopy and nano-grains in the interstellar medium. She loads data into the NASA Ames PAH IR Spectroscopic Database (PAHdb), which helps interpret JWST data. In NASA Solar System Workings, Ricca studies ammonia hydrates on Charon and other icy bodies, in which she interprets data collected by the Cassini mission, which detected small, large, and macromolecular organics near the Enceladus plume. The goal of this project is to determine if these substances were derived from life or abiotic processes. In addition to her work at NASA, Ricca is a Senior Research Chemist at the SETI Institute.Dr. Ricca is a member of America Chemical Society (ACS) since 1995.

== Early life and education ==
Alessandra Ricca was born to an Italian father and a Swiss mother in Sanremo, Italy. Her family was heavily focused on medicine, as her father was an M.D., and her mother helped him with cancer detection testing. From a young age, she enjoyed watching the TV series Medical Center and was influenced by her family to become a doctor, as her father was a surgeon. She also has a brother who is five years younger than her.

Ricca has an Italian and Swiss dual citizenship. After spending her early years in Italy, she attended a religious boarding school in Monaco in 9th grade. The boarding school experience shocked her, from French being the primary language spoken at the institution to sharing a room with thirty girls. She then transferred to Geneva, Switzerland, to finish high school and attended the University of Geneva. Once again, all her classes were in French. In college, she initially majored in biochemistry but later switched to chemistry, as biochemistry was a newer field that was relatively harder to understand. Ricca also wanted to major in medicine but eventually became interested in research: "I’m very curious, and I like to solve things. I’m a problem solver, so I became more interested in research, and I realized that I was distancing myself more and more from being a practitioner or even a surgeon."

Ricca received her Bachelor of Science degree (B.S.) and Master of Science (M.S.) from the University of Geneva in December 1988 and March 1989, respectively. She studied organic chemistry in college and later began a PhD in Zurich, Switzerland. However, she eventually left and went to Geneva for a PhD in theoretical chemistry in collaboration with the University of Geneva's pharmaceutical department. In July 1993, she received a PhD. in Physical chemistry from the University of Geneva, Switzerland. After receiving her PhD, she decided to stay in Switzerland but later moved to the Bay Area when she received a National Research Council Research Associateship at NASA Ames Research Center. In 1995, she became a NASA Ames Postdoctoral Fellow. Since she had a J-1 visa, she had to leave after two years and went to London, England for another postdoc. She became a Postdoctoral Fellow at King's College London She eventually returned to the United States and worked with Professor Charles Musgrave on calculations in material science at Stanford from 1997 to 1998. She was also hired by Eloret Corporation to work on thermochemistry and nanotechnology. When the nanotechnology project ended, she began to work on PAHs with scientists in Code S and eventually studied space science.

== Personal life ==
Ricca is married and has two daughters, one in college and the other in high school. She also has two black cats and a hamster. Ricca likes to travel with her family and hike long trails with her husband in Hawaii. In addition, she enjoys music, singing, and the arts, often attending concerts and art exhibits. She also likes to do gardening, photography, and do-it-yourself projects.

Ricca is proud of her family: "I think having a family and nice kids and a great husband, whose support is really great." She also dreamed of coming to the United States when she was younger, and she fulfilled that dream by moving to the U.S. alone. Her first inspirations were her parents and the people she met who helped her throughout her life.

Ricca also enjoys reading classical French literature, which she didn't when she was younger. She prefers reading in French, her native language, stating that "I just take pleasure in reading [French literature] because I can capture all the subtleties, which are very often lost to me in English." To her, reading Proust "is like a painting with all these colors. It’s like a piece of art and gives me great enjoyment."

== Other activities ==
From 2001 to 2008, she mentored students attending summer programs at the University of Notre Dame and UC Berkeley. In 2005, she was a reviewer for the National Science Foundation, and from 2006 through 2008, she was a mentor for the Summer Research for Undergraduates Program in Astrobiology at the SETI Institute. She was also a referee for the Journal of Physical Chemistry, Chemical Physics, Chemical Physics Letters, and Astrophysical Journal. In addition, she has published many articles and has been invited to peer review them as well.

A piece of advice that she would give younger students is to stay focused and tenacious: "You have to really be extremely perseverant because you get rejection after rejection. You have to be willing to keep going on and on and not get discouraged if you get a lot of negative comments. You have to have a lot of grit. You need to be very passionate to overcome all these kinds of barriers."

== Honors and awards ==
Alessandra Ricca won the 1997 Feynman Prize in Nanotechnology and the 2008 NASA Honor Award. She also won the 1999 ELORET Thermosciences Institute Outstanding Achievement Award and the 2000 and 2002 ELORET Superior Achievement Award.
