= Feynman Prize in Nanotechnology =

- Awarded for: Experimental and theoretical advancements in nanotechnology research
- Country: United States
- Presented by: Foresight Institute
- First award: 1993
- Website: foresight.org/prizes/feynman-prizes/

The Feynman Prize in Nanotechnology is an award given by the Foresight Institute for significant advances in nanotechnology. Two prizes are awarded annually, in the categories of experimental and theoretical work. There is also a separate challenge award for making a nanoscale robotic arm and 8-bit adder.

== Overview ==
The Feynman Prize consists of annual prizes in experimental and theory categories, as well as a one-time challenge award. They are awarded by the Foresight Institute, a nanotechnology advocacy organization. The prizes are named in honor of physicist Richard Feynman, whose 1959 talk There's Plenty of Room at the Bottom is considered by nanotechnology advocates to have inspired and informed the start of the field of nanotechnology.

The annual Feynman Prize in Nanotechnology is awarded for pioneering work in nanotechnology, towards the goal of constructing atomically precise products through molecular machine systems. Input on prize candidates comes from both Foresight Institute personnel and outside academic and commercial organizations. The awardees are selected mainly by an annually changing body of former winners and other academics. The prize is considered prestigious, and authors of one study considered it to be reasonably representative of notable research in the parts of nanotechnology under its scope.

The separate Feynman Grand Prize is a $250,000 challenge award to the first persons to create both a nanoscale robotic arm capable of precise positional control, and a nanoscale 8-bit adder, conforming to given specifications. It is intended to stimulate the field of molecular nanotechnology.

== History ==
The Feynman Prize was instituted in the context of Foresight Institute co-founder K. Eric Drexler's advocacy of funding for molecular manufacturing. The prize was first given in 1993. Before 1997, one prize was given biennially. From 1997 on, two prizes were given each year in theory and experimental categories. By awarding these prizes early in the history of the field, the prize increased awareness of nanotechnology and influenced its direction.

The Grand Prize was announced in 1995 at the Fourth Foresight Conference on Molecular Nanotechnology and was sponsored by James Von Ehr and Marc Arnold. In 2004, X-Prize Foundation founder Peter Diamandis was selected to chair the Feynman Grand Prize committee.

== Recipients ==
=== Single prize ===
Year	Laureate	Institution	Scope of work
1993	Charles Musgrave	California Institute of Technology	Molecular modelling of atomically precise manufacturing
1995	Nadrian C. Seeman	New York University	DNA nanotechnology

=== Experimental category ===
Year	Laureate	Institution	Scope of work
1997	James K. Gimzewski	IBM Zurich Research Laboratory	Scanning probe microscopy for atomically precise manufacturing
1997	Reto Schlittler	IBM Zurich Research Laboratory	Scanning probe microscopy for atomically precise manufacturing
1997	Christian Joachim	CEMES/French National Centre for Scientific Research	Scanning probe microscopy for atomically precise manufacturing
1998	M. Reza Ghadiri	Scripps Research Institute	Molecular self-assembly
1999	Phaedon Avouris	IBM Watson Research Center	Molecular scale electronics using carbon nanotubes
2000	R. Stanley Williams	HP Labs	Switches for molecular scale electronics
2000	Philip Kuekes	HP Labs	Switches for molecular scale electronics
2000	James R. Heath	University of California, Los Angeles	Switches for molecular scale electronics
2001	Charles M. Lieber	Harvard University	Synthesis and characterization of carbon nanotubes
2002	Chad Mirkin	Northwestern University	Spherical nucleic acid nanoparticles
2003	Carlo Montemagno	University of California, Los Angeles	Integration of biological molecular motors with silicon devices
2004	Homme Hellinga	Duke University	Atomically precise manufacturing
2005	Christian Schafmeister	University of Pittsburgh	Synthesis of designed macromolecules
2006	Erik Winfree	California Institute of Technology	DNA computing using algorithmic self-assembly
2006	Paul W. K. Rothemund	California Institute of Technology	DNA computing using algorithmic self-assembly
2007	J. Fraser Stoddart	University of California, Los Angeles	Synthesis and assembly of molecular machines
2008	James Tour	Rice University	Synthesis of nanocars and other molecular machines
2009	Yoshiaki Sugimoto	Osaka University	Non-contact atomic force microscopy for manipulation of single atoms
2009	Masayuki Abe	Osaka University	Non-contact atomic force microscopy for manipulation of single atoms
2009	Oscar Custance	Japanese National Institute for Materials Science	Non-contact atomic force microscopy for manipulation of single atoms
2010	Masakazu Aono	MANA Center, Japanese National Institute for Materials Science	Scanning probe microscopy for manipulation of atoms
2011	Leonhard Grill	Fritz Haber Institute of the Max Planck Society	Scanning probe microscopy for characterization and manipulation of molecules
2012	Gerhard Meyer	IBM Zurich Research Laboratory	Imaging and manipulation of molecular orbitals using scanning probe microscopy
2012	Leo Gross	IBM Zurich Research Laboratory	Imaging and manipulation of molecular orbitals using scanning probe microscopy
2012	Jascha Repp	IBM Zurich Research Laboratory	Imaging and manipulation of molecular orbitals using scanning probe microscopy
2013	Alexander Zettl	University of California, Berkeley	Nanoscale electromechanical systems
2014	Joseph W. Lyding	University of Illinois at Urbana–Champaign	Hydrogen depassivation lithography using scanning tunneling microscopes
2015	Michelle Y. Simmons	University of New South Wales	Fabrication of single-atom transistors
2016	Franz J. Giessibl	University of Regensburg	Imaging and manipulation of individual atoms using scanning probe microscopy
2017	William Shih	Harvard University	DNA nanotechnology
2018	Christopher Lutz	IBM Almaden Research Center	Manipulating atoms and small molecules for data storage and computation
2018	Andreas J. Heinrich	Center for Quantum Nanoscience, Institute for Basic Science	Manipulating atoms and small molecules for data storage and computation
2019	Lulu Qian	California Institute of Technology	Molecular robotics, self-assembly of DNA structures, and biochemical circuits
2020	Hao Yan	Arizona State University	Use of DNA as designer molecular building blocks for programmable molecular self-assembly.
2021	Anne-Sophie Duwez	University of Liège	Developed tools and technologies to interface synthetic functional molecules with AFM to study their operation and her other single-molecule research.
2022	Sergei V. Kalinin	University of Tennessee	Applications of machine learning and artificial intelligence in nanotechnology, atomic fabrication, and materials discovery via scanning transmission electron microscopy, as well as mesoscopic studies of electrochemical, ferroelectric, and transport phenomena via scanning probe microscopy.
2023	James J. Collins	Massachusetts Institute of Technology	For pioneering work on synthetic gene circuits that launched the field of synthetic biology and has enabled the development of programmable biomolecular tools for the life sciences, medicine and nanobiotechnology.
2024	Saw Wai Hla	Ohio University	For outstanding contributions to molecular machine research and atomically precise manipulation techniques.
2025	Ben L. Feringa	University of Groningen	For pioneering the control of molecular motion.

=== Theory category ===
Year	Laureate	Institution	Scope of work
1997	Charles Bauschlicher	NASA Ames Research Center	Computational nanotechnology
1997	Stephen Barnard	NASA Ames Research Center	Computational nanotechnology
1997	Creon Levit	NASA Ames Research Center	Computational nanotechnology
1997	Glenn Deardorff	NASA Ames Research Center	Computational nanotechnology
1997	Al Globus	NASA Ames Research Center	Computational nanotechnology
1997	Jie Han	NASA Ames Research Center	Computational nanotechnology
1997	Richard Jaffe	NASA Ames Research Center	Computational nanotechnology
1997	Alessandra Ricca	NASA Ames Research Center	Computational nanotechnology
1997	Marzio Rosi	NASA Ames Research Center	Computational nanotechnology
1997	Deepak Srivastava	NASA Ames Research Center	Computational nanotechnology
1997	H. Thuemmel	NASA Ames Research Center	Computational nanotechnology
1998	Ralph C. Merkle	Zyvex	Molecular tools for atomically precise chemical reactions
1998	Stephen Walch	ELORET Corporation/NASA Ames Research Center	Molecular tools for atomically precise chemical reactions
1999	William A. Goddard III	California Institute of Technology	Modeling of molecular machines
1999	Tahir Cagin	California Institute of Technology	Modeling of molecular machines
1999	Yue Qi	California Institute of Technology	Modeling of molecular machines
2000	Uzi Landman	Georgia Institute of Technology	Computational materials science for nanostructures
2001	Mark A. Ratner	Northwestern University	Molecular scale electronics
2002	Don Brenner	North Carolina State University	Molecular machines for molecular manufacturing
2003	Marvin L. Cohen	University of California, Berkeley	Modeling of new materials
2003	Steven G. Louie	University of California, Berkeley	Modeling of new materials
2004	David Baker	University of Washington	Development of RosettaDesign
2004	Brian Kuhlman	University of North Carolina, Chapel Hill	Development of RosettaDesign
2005	Christian Joachim	French National Centre for Scientific Research	Theoretical tools and design principles for molecular machines
2006	Erik Winfree	California Institute of Technology	DNA computing
2006	Paul W. K. Rothemund	California Institute of Technology	DNA computing
2007	David A. Leigh	University of Edinburgh	Design and synthesis of molecular machines
2008	George C. Schatz	Northwestern University	Modeling of dip-pen nanolithography, and of plasmon effects in metallic nanoparticles
2009	Robert A. Freitas Jr.	Institute for Molecular Manufacturing	Mechanosynthesis and systems design of molecular machines
2010	Gustavo E. Scuseria	Rice University	Tools for modeling of carbon nanostructures
2011	Raymond Astumian	University of Maine	Molecular machines powered by Brownian motion
2012	David Soloveichik	University of California, San Francisco	DNA computing using strand displacement cascades
2013	David Beratan	Duke University	Functional supramolecular assemblies
2014	Amanda Barnard	Australian Commonwealth Scientific and Industrial Research Organisation	Carbon nanostructure structure-function relationships
2015	Markus J. Buehler	Massachusetts Institute of Technology	Mechanical simulations of materials
2016	Bartosz Grzybowski	Ulsan National Institute of Science and Technology	Modeling of the outcomes of organic reactions
2017	Giovanni Zocchi	University of California, Los Angeles	Stress–strain analysis of soft nanoparticles
2018	O. Anatole von Lilienfeld	University of Basel, now University of Toronto	Methods for fast quantum mechanical modelling
2019	Giulia Galli	University of Chicago	The development of theoretical and computational methods to predict and design, from first principles, the properties of nanostructured materials.
2020	Massimiliano Di Ventra	University of California, San Diego	Quantum transport in nanoscale and atomic systems; prediction of nanoscale phenomena which were later verified experimentally, studied memory effects in materials and devices.
2021	Kendall N. Houk	UCLA	Quantum mechanical and molecular dynamics simulations which have elucidated structural and dynamical features of synthetic nanomachines.
2022	James R. Chelikowsky	University of Texas	Pioneered the use of computational approaches to understand and predict the properties of materials at the nanoscale.
2023	Alexandre Tkatchenko	University of Luxembourg	For pioneering the development of methods that seamlessly merge quantum mechanics, statistical mechanics, and machine learning to unravel the intricacies of complex molecules and materials.
2024	Klaus-Robert Müller	Technische Universität Berlin	For groundbreaking work applying machine learning to scientific challenges across physics, chemistry, and neuroscience.
2025	Nicola Marzari	Cambridge University	For developing the theoretical and computational infrastructure that underpins modern atomically precise materials discovery.

== See also ==
- Kavli Prize in Nanoscience
- IEEE Pioneer Award in Nanotechnology
- ISNSCE Nanoscience Award
- UPenn NBIC Award for Research Excellence in Nanotechnology
- List of physics awards
