= Wescam =

Canadian imaging systems company

L3Harris Wescam
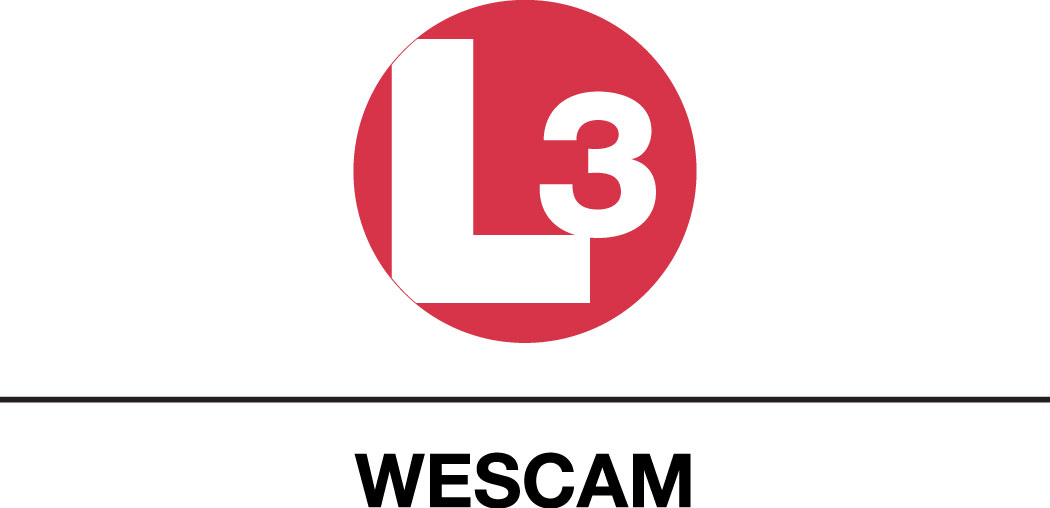
- Company type: Public (NYSE: LHX)
- Industry: Defense, Technology, Security, Law Enforcement
- Founded: 1959 (Originally Westinghouse Canada, became L-3 Wescam in 2002)
- Headquarters: Hamilton, Ontario, Canada
- Products: EO-IR imaging systems
- Parent: L3Harris Technologies
- Website: www.Wescam.com

L3Harris Wescam, stylized as L3Harris WESCAM, is a Canadian company specializing in the production of gyro-stabilized, EO-IR imaging systems. Wescam Inc. is a subsidiary of L3Harris Technologies. The name has become synonymous with cameras of the type although several organizations around the world manufacture similar systems. Wescam is based in Hamilton, Ontario, Canada.

== History ==
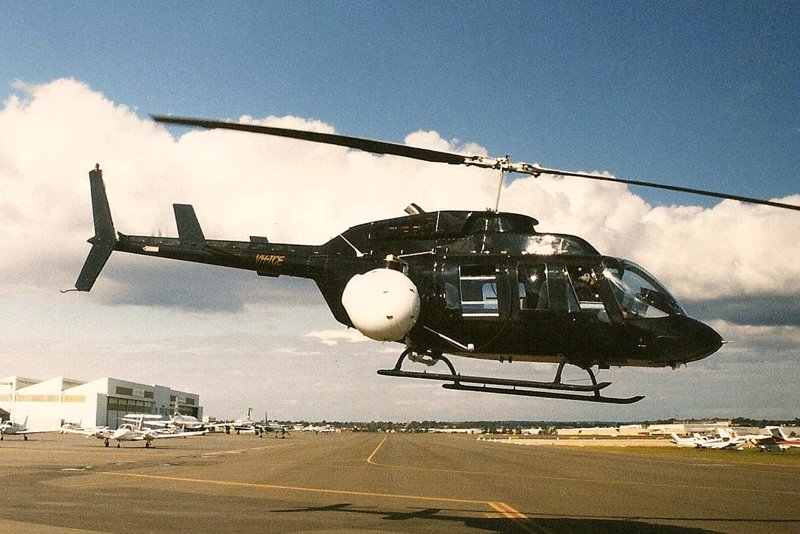
A Bell LongRanger fitted with a Wescam gyro-stabilised camera

In 1959, the military division of Westinghouse Canada developed a stabilized camera mount for the Canadian Defense Research Establishment. The product was named WESSCAM - Westinghouse Steered Stabilized Camera Mount.

In 1974, WESSCAM inventor Nox Leavitt purchased the lab equipment and patents from Westinghouse and founded Istec Limited, Isolation Stabilization Technologies. The company had 17 employees and generated approximately $1 million in revenue. It experienced substantial expansion through internal growth and strategic acquisitions. This brought complementary technologies into the company and broadened its intellectual capability and market share.

In 1994, Istec changed its name to Wescam and in 1995 Wescam went public on the Toronto Stock Exchange.

In 2002, L3 Technologies acquired Wescam. As part of L3 Technologies, Wescam has expanded its presence in the U.S., and increased its base of products and service offerings to customers.

In June 2019, L3 Wescam became L3Harris Wescam when their parent company – L3 Technologies – had a "merger of equals" with Harris Corporation.

In November 2021, Wescam moved its headquarters to a new production facility in Hamilton, Ontario.

== Products ==
Wescam's primary product line is the MX-Series, which consists of MX-series turret families—the MX-8, MX-10, MX-15, MX-20 and MX-25. These are all controlled by the US ITAR. They are currently used by defence, homeland security, and law enforcement agencies as well as in televised sporting events, such as NASCAR. These products are typically mounted on fixed-wing, rotor-wing, UAV and Aerostat airborne platforms and also on numerous armoured vehicles, and marine-based platforms.

=== MX-10 ===
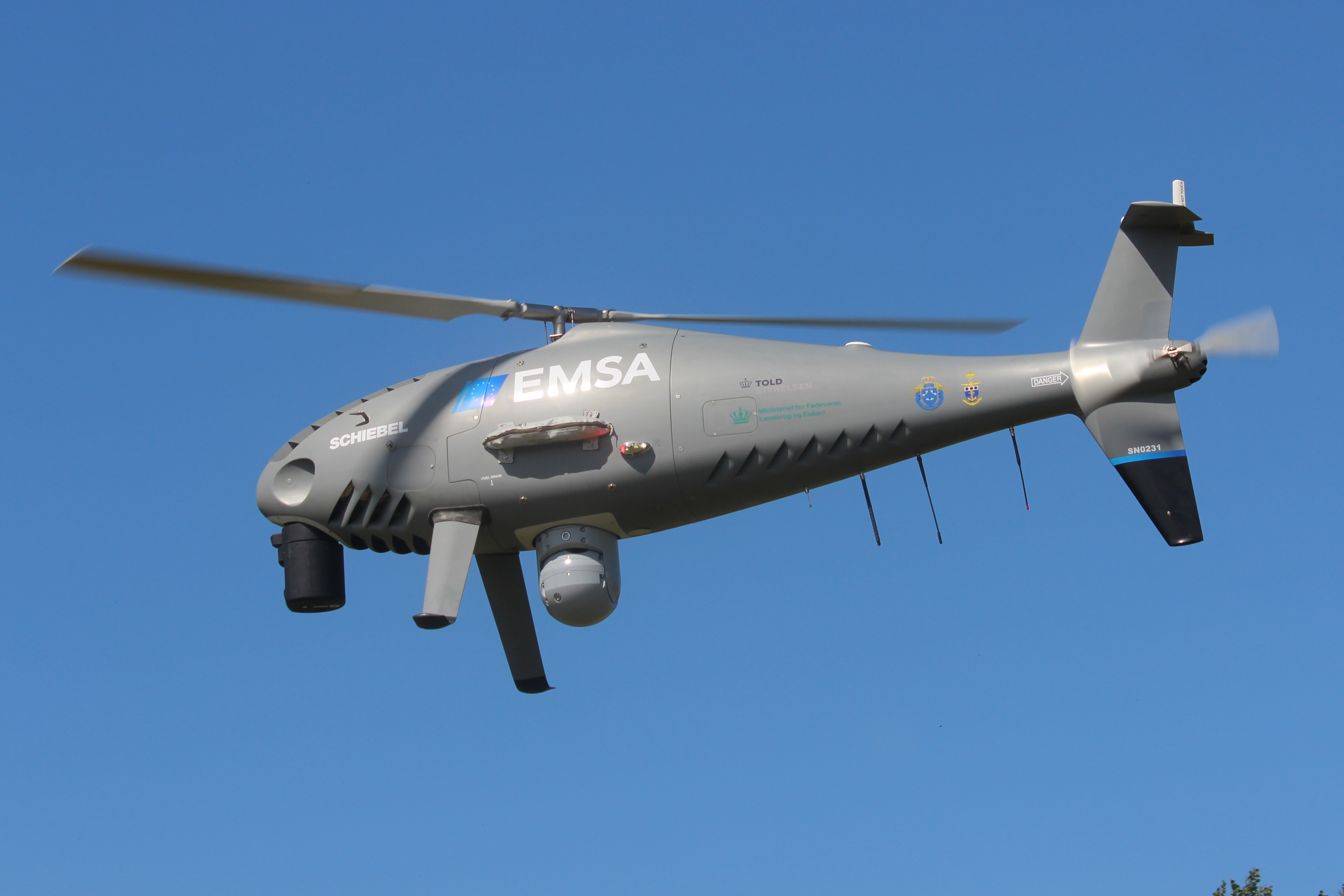
A Schiebel Camcopter S-100 unmanned helicopter fitted with a Wescam MX-10

Introduced in 2009, the MX-10 is Wescam's newest imaging system. Its fully integrated weight is 38 pounds (17 kg). It has a 10-inch (25 cm) diameter and stands 14 inches (36 cm) tall. This small size and low weight reduce the weight and clearance requirements for installation on manned and unmanned airborne platforms. The MX-10 can incorporate several different types of sensors (up to six), including high-definition daylight and infrared sensors.

Wescam has been in the process of creating variations of the MX-10 for use in a wider range of applications. The MX-10GS (GS: Ground System) has been adapted for mounting on a ground vehicle where it can sit atop a mast or tower for a higher point of view, whether the vehicle is moving or stationary. The MX-10MS (MS:Marinized System) has also been created, and Zyvex Technologies has operated it on the Piranha Unmanned Surface Vessel (USV).

WESCAM's MX 10 is a compact Multi-Sensor, Multi-Spectral imaging system for surveillance missions from light aircraft.

The Wescam MX-10 thermal imaging system houses two cameras. A color camera used primarily during the day can read an object the size of a license plate from more than 750 feet away. The second camera, an infrared thermal imager, can be used during the day and at night. Infrared technology permits the flight crew to see objects that may otherwise go undetected at night. The MX-10 system costs more than 400.000 US Dollars.

=== MX-15 ===
The MX-15 is Wescam's most popular family of imaging systems. This turret can weigh up to 100 pounds (45 kg) with a diameter of 15.5 inches (39 cm) and a height of 19 inches (48 cm). The MX-15 Family includes the MX-15, the MX-15HDi (High-Definition variant), the MX-15D (Designator variant) and the MX-15GS (Ground System variant). These imaging systems are usually installed on manned fixed- and rotary-wing aircraft. The price for a single set is above $1 million US Dollars.

=== MX-20 ===
Of the MX-Series, the MX-20 is the largest imaging system, weighing in at up to 198 pounds (90 kg). It has a diameter of 21 inches (53 cm) and a height of 26 inches (66 cm). This larger system is typically installed on large, fixed-wing aircraft, such as the P-3 Orion, Bayraktar Akıncı and Aerostats. This turret is used for long-range surveillance, as it can identify and engage subjects from over 20 km away.

=== MX-Series key attributes ===
- Simplified Installation/Integration: These products do not require external or support electronics, thus simplifying installation and reducing weight and space requirements. Wescam has also implemented common operator interfaces and Line Replaceable Units (LRUs) to maintain interchangeability between turret models and platforms within a fleet.
- Long-Range Optimization: MX-Series imaging systems use custom-designed, large-aperture lenses to for high magnification, state-of-the-art sensors for high resolution, and a missile-grade, solid-state Inertial Measurement Unit for "rock-solid" stabilization.
- On-Board Inertial Measurement Unit (IMU): While similar products often require a mounting intercase for the IMU to stabilize the camera, the MX-Series has an integrated IMU, which in turn reduces payload requirements. The IMU allows the system to have a precise, jitter-free lock on any geographic position and a very high target location accuracy, despite aircraft manoeuvres and noise in the aircraft's GPS/INS system. When connected to a GPS antenna, the onboard IMU enables the turret to point to any geographic location supplied by a third party moving map system.
- Compatibility with third-party systems: The MX-Series turrets are able to downlink to third-party communications systems in order to provide a clear visual of the situation in real time. This compatibility allows a wide range of installations, spanning even complex, multi-operational systems.
- Continuous improvement: Wescam invests heavily in research and development in order to incorporate ultramodern technology into the MX-Series. Some contracts also involve a spiral growth path, allowing Wescam to modify the turret over time in order to fit to customers' evolving requirements.

== Customers ==
Wescam serves militaries and agencies around the world. Below is a short list of some of its customers.

- Air Attack, France
- Australian Federal Police
- Turkish Armed Forces
- Canadian Department of National Defence
- Catalunya Police
- Chilean Navy
- French Gendarmerie
- Icelandic Coast Guard
- Italian Air Force
- Italian Army
- Italian Carabinieri
- Italian Coast Guard
- Italian Finance Guard
- Italian Navy
- Italian State Police
- Lithuanian Air Force
- Luxembourg Police
- OHB-System, Germany
- Portuguese Air Force
- Royal Netherlands Air Force
- Royal Norwegian Air Force
- Spanish Fisheries
- Spanish UME
- National Police Air Service (NPAS)
- Swedish Coast Guard
- Trafico Spain
- UK Maritime & Coast Guard
- UK Ministry of Defence
- US Air Force
- US Army
- US Customs & Border Patrol
- US Federal Bureau of Investigation (FBI)
- US Navy
