= Donald W. Brenner =

American scientist

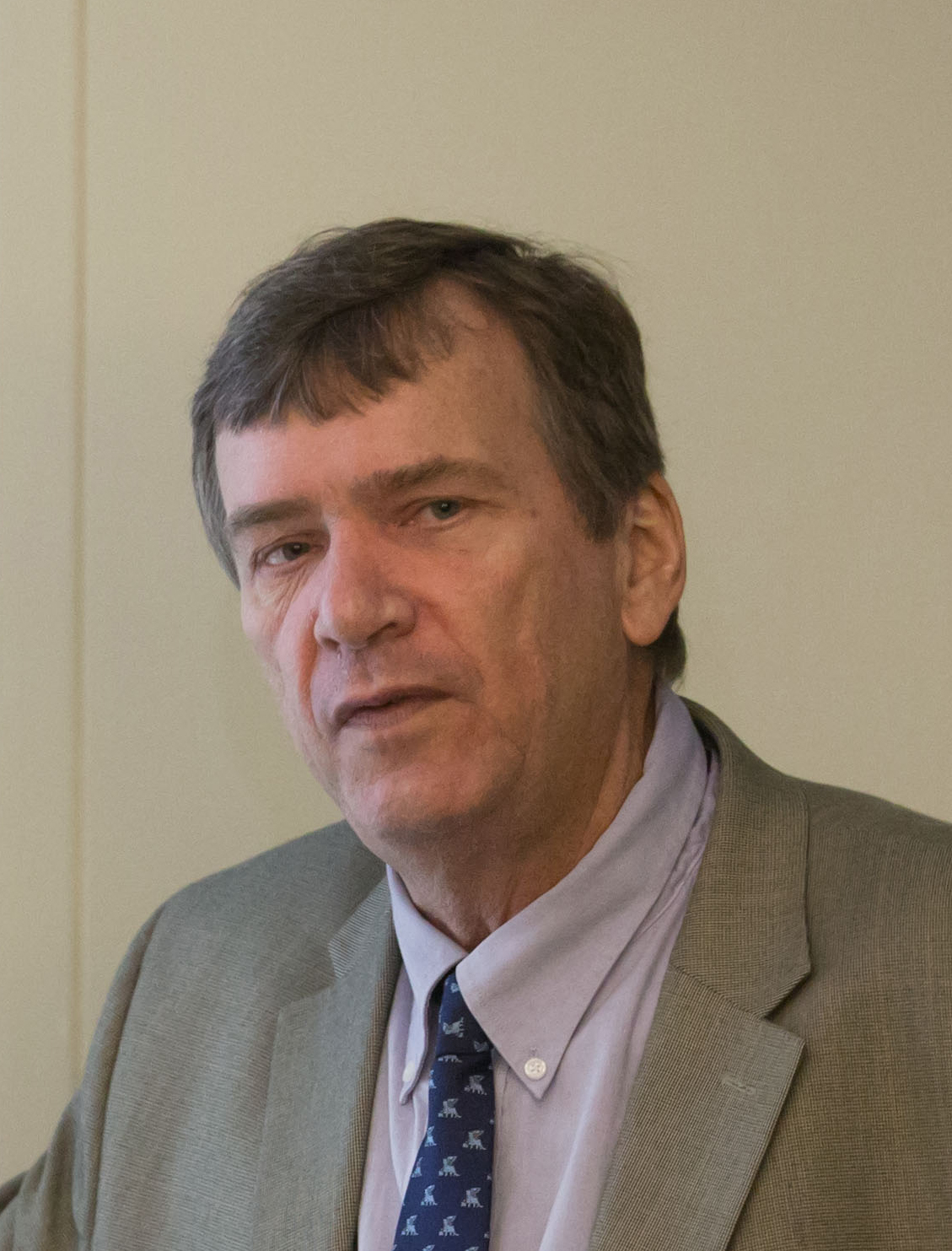
- Education: Pennsylvania State University; State University of New York
- Known for: Reactive empirical bond order
- Scientific career
- Fields: Computational materials science
- Workplaces: North Carolina State University; U.S. Naval Research Laboratory
- Website: Brenner Research Group

Donald W. Brenner is a Kobe Distinguished Professor and Head of the Department of Materials Science and Engineering at North Carolina State University. His research focuses on computational studies of materials for extreme environments, high entropy ceramics, tribology and tribochemistry, shock and high strain rate dynamics, nuclear materials, and self-assembled monolayers.

== Research and career ==
Donald W. Brenner is best known for his development of the reactive empirical bond order (REBO) interatomic potential, which was a precursor to ReaxFF and similar many-body reactive potentials. After receiving his Ph.D. in Chemistry Brenner was a member of the research staff in the Theoretical Chemistry Section at the U.S. Naval Research Laboratory in Washington DC before joining the faculty at the North Carolina State University.

His honors include the 2002 Feynman Prize in Nanotechnology (theory), the 2013 Alcoa Foundation Distinguished Engineering Achievement Award, and the 2016 Alexander Quarles Holladay Medal for Excellence. He is also an editor of the "Handbook of Nanoscience, Engineering and Technology, three editions", W. Goddard, D. Brenner, S. Lyshevski and G. Iafrate, Eds., CRC Press (2002, 2007 and 2012).

== Education ==
- B.S. in Chemistry from the State University of New York in 1982
- Ph.D. in Chemistry from Pennsylvania State University in 1987
