= Leonhard Grill =

Austrian experimental physicist

- Education: University of Graz
- Occupation: Experimental physicist

Leonhard Grill is an Austrian experimental physicist. He is a professor at the University of Graz in the field of nanoscience, in particular with functional molecules on surfaces.

== Education ==
After his undergraduate studies in physics at the University of Graz, Grill worked with Silvio Modesti at the Istituto Nazionale per la Fisica della Materia (INFM) in Trieste on his doctoral thesis: "Growth of thin metallic overlayers on Ge(111): Electron confinement and characterization of image resonances by selective electron scattering". He then moved to the Freie University of Berlin (FU Berlin) to work with Karl-Heinz Rieder where he began to work on the manipulation of single molecules using scanning tunneling microscopy (STM). In 2007 he submitted his habilitation at the FU Berlin.

== Academic career ==
He was appointed Professor of Physical Chemistry at the University of Graz in 2013.

== Research ==
Grill's research group uses scanning tunneling microscopy and spectroscopy to study and selectively manipulate molecules on surfaces. His interests range from chemical processes of single atoms and molecules to the bottom-up growth of two-dimensional supra- and macromolecular assemblies. Additional research areas include molecules with mechanical, chemical, electronic, optical or electrical functionalities.

By pulling individual polymers off of a surface with the tip of the scanning tunnelling microscope, Grill's group was able to measure for the first time the conductivity of individual molecular wires as a function of their length. He studied the switching mechanism of single-molecule switches, based on intramolecular isomerization or proton transfer. In addition, his group found that a strong influence of the immediate environment on each molecule existed – caused both by the atomic lattice of the surface and single atoms in the vicinity of the molecule.

His contributions to the field of molecular dynamics on surfaces include rolling the first molecular wheels across a surface, activating molecular motors with light, and moving individual molecules over relatively large distances with extremely high precision. By combining a molecule with a surface, his group discovered a novel type of molecular motor that can move unidirectionally with 100% efficiency, and even transport individual carbon monoxide molecules as "cargo". This system has been described as "a nanoscale bulldozer". Through the precisely controlled collision of individual molecules on a surface, it was demonstrated that successful chemical reactions occur only in rare cases and exclusively under very specific geometric arrangements.

Grill developed, together with Stefan Hecht, "covalent on-surface polymerization", in which molecular building blocks are connected to construct highly defined and stable networks on surfaces.

== Awards ==
- 2024 Research Prize of the Province of Styria (Forschungspreis des Landes Steiermark)
- 2023 Advanced Grant of the European Research Council (ERC)
- 2017 Winner of the first Nanocar Race (together with Grant Simpson and James Tour), selected as Research of the Year 2017 by the C&EN Journal of the American Chemical Society
- 2011 Feynman Prize in Nanotechnology of the Foresight Institute
- 2010 Young Leaders in Science scholarship of the Schering Foundation
