= Stefan Hecht =

German chemist (born 1974)

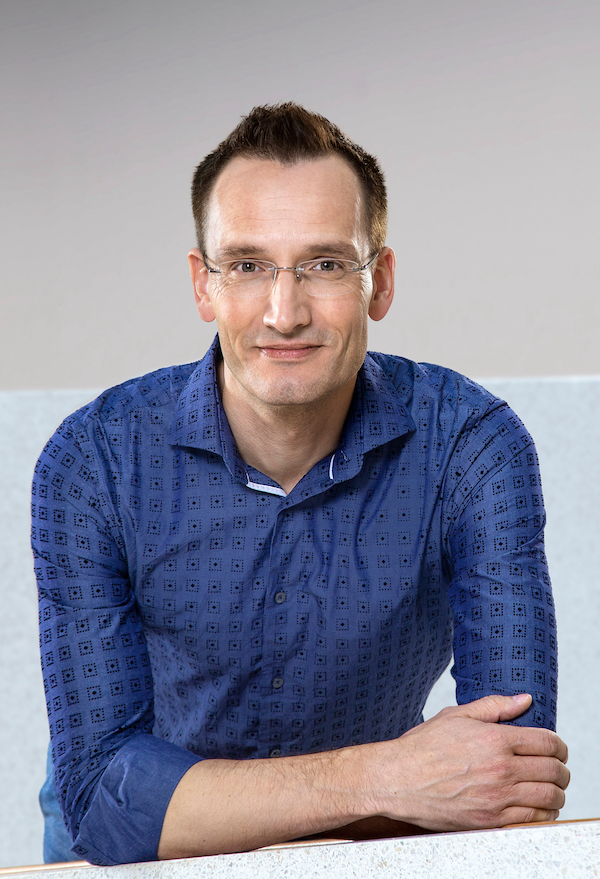
Stefan Hecht (30 November 2020)

Stefan Hecht (born 6 January 1974) is a German chemist.

== Life ==
Hecht was born in 1974 in East Berlin. He studied chemistry from 1992 to 1997 at the Humboldt-Universität zu Berlin and the University of California, Berkeley, where he carried out his diploma thesis research with the late William G. Dauben about "New Mechanistic Insight into the Lumiketone Rearrangement – Wavelength-Dependent Photochemistry of 4-Methoxybicyclo[3.1.0]hex-3-en-2-ones". After his diploma in chemistry, he carried out his graduate work from 1997 to 2001 on the "Synthesis and Application of Functional Branched Macromolecules – From Site Isolation and Energy Harvesting to Catalysis" in the research group of Jean Fréchet at the University of California, Berkeley.

After his return to Germany in the fall of 2001, Hecht established his independent research program as one of the first Sofja Kovalevskaja Awardees, initially as a Young Investigator at the Freie Universität Berlin and since 2005 as group leader at the Max Planck Institute for Coal Research in Mülheim upon Ruhr. In the fall of 2006 he became the youngest W3-professor in chemistry in Germany and holder of the chair of organic chemistry and functional materials at Humboldt-Universität zu Berlin. From 2019 until 2022 he was the scientific director of the DWI – Leibniz Institute for Interactive Materials in Aachen and held the chair for macromolecular chemistry at RWTH Aachen University. Since the fall of 2022 he is Einstein Professor at Humboldt-Universität zu Berlin and founding director of the Center for the Science of Materials Berlin (CSMB).

Hecht is co-founder of the start-up company xolo GmbH that has been developing and commercializing xolography as new volumetric 3D printing technology since 2019.

He is married and father of two adult daughters.

== Research ==
Hecht is a synthetic chemist with research interests that span from macromolecular and supramolecular chemistry over photochemistry and electrochemistry all the way to surface and interface phenomena. Particular focus of his work is on the development of photoswitchable molecules to optically control of physical, chemical, and biological processes and their application in materials, (opto)electronic devices, and additive manufacturing.

Together with Leonhard Grill, Hecht has pioneered the development of "On-Surface Polymerization" as a new precision synthesis method for 1D and 2D nanostructures, such as molecular wires, graphene ribbons, and networks.

Hecht has made several seminal contribution in the area of photochromism by significantly improving the properties of molecular photoswitches and by exploiting them in a variety of applications. For example, he could address azobenzene by an electric field or by electron/hole catalysis, establish ortho-fluoroazobenzenes as solely visible light switchable and thermally stable photoswitches, develop extremely fatigue resistant diarylethenes as well as photoswitches based on acylhydrazones and indigos, and moreover design dihydropyrenes that allow for single NIR photon switching. His photoswitches enable to control and drive various processes (folding, reactivity, and catalysis), materials (self-healing and detection), and devices (transistors, memories, displays) and actuators.

Together with Martin Regehly he has invented xolography. Xolography is a volumetric 3D printing method, which enables the rapid manufacturing of complex objects and entire systems directly in volume with high precision (resolution) and high material quality (homogeneous material with smooth surfaces). The technology and its application in additive manufacturing are being developed by the start-up company xolo GmbH, which he helped to co-found.

== Awards ==
- 2022: Einstein Professorship of the Einstein Foundation Berlin
- 2021: member of European Academy of Science
- 2020: fellow of the Max Planck School "Matter to Life"
- 2020: member of the German Academy of Science and Engineering (acatech)
- 2020: member of Academia Europaea
- 2012: starting grant (consolidator phase) of the European Research Council (ERC)
- 2010: Klung-Wilhelmy-Weberbank-Prize in Chemistry
- 2005: ADUC Young Investigator Award by the German Chemical Society
- 2004: MIT's Technology Review TR100 Top 100 Young Innovator Award
- 2001–2004: Sofia Kovalevskaya Award of the Alexander von Humboldt Foundation
- 1994–1997: fellow of the Studienstiftung des Deutschen Volkes
- 1993: Jugend Forscht Young Chemist Award (federal, regional & environmental prize)
- 1991: Jugend Forscht Young Chemist Award (regional prize)
