= Hao Yan =

Chemist

Hao Yan is a Chinese-American chemist, biomolecular designer, molecular programmer, and engineer known for pioneering contributions to structural DNA nanotechnology, molecular self-assembly, and biomolecular engineering. He is the Regents Professor and Milton D. Glick Distinguished Professor in the School of Molecular Sciences and the John Shufeldt School of Medicine and Medical Engineering at Arizona State University and serves as Director of the Biodesign Center for Molecular Design and Biomimetics at the Biodesign Institute. Yan is internationally recognized for advancing the design and construction of programmable DNA, RNA and protein-based nanostructures and for developing molecular systems capable of computation, sensing, therapeutics, and nanoscale manufacturing.

== Early life and education ==
Hao Yan earned his Bachelor of Science degree in Chemistry from Shandong University in China in 1993. He later pursued doctoral studies at New York University under the mentorship of Professor Nadrian Seeman. Yan completed his Ph.D in Chemistry in 2001, where he worked on the design and construction of sequence-dependent DNA nanomechanical devices and molecular systems based on programmable nucleic acid interactions. Following his doctoral training, Yan joined the Department of Computer Science at Duke University as an Assistant Research Professor. During this period, he expanded his work into DNA-based molecular computation and programmable molecular systems.

== Career at Arizona State University ==
Yan joined Arizona State University in 2004 as an Assistant Professor in the Department of Chemistry and Biochemistry and the Biodesign Institute. Due to the rapid impact of his research, he was directly promoted to Full Professor with early tenure in 2008, by passing the rank of Associate Professor.

In 2012, ASU named Yan the inaugural Milton D. Glick Distinguished Professor of Chemistry and Biochemistry. In 2013, he became the Director of the Center for Molecular Design and Biomimetics in the Biodesign Institute. In 2025, the Arizona Board of Regents awarded Yan the title of Regents Professor, the highest faculty distinction within Arizona's public university system, recognizing sustained pioneering achievements and international leadership in research.

Yan has also held leadership roles in the international scientific community, including having served as President of the International Society for Nanoscale Science, Computation, and Engineering from 2013-2015. He currently serves as Associate Editor for Science Advances and ACS Applied Bio Materials. He serves as General co-Chair for the Annual Conference on Foundation of Nanoscience since 2024.

== Research and scientific contributions ==
The central theme of Yan's research is the use of nature's design principles to create programmable molecular systems capable of performing complex functions. His interdisciplinary laboratory integrates chemistry, nanotechnology, molecular engineering, materials science, biophysics, computation, and synthetic biology.

Yan's research focuses on designing bio-inspired molecular building blocks - particularly DNA, RNA and proteins - and programming their self-assembly into functional architectures and dynamic systems. His work seeks to engineer information-guided self-assembling molecular systems that enable precise spatial organization and interactions at the nanoscale.

His laboratory has contributed extensively to the development of:

- Structural DNA nanotechnology and DNA origami
- DNA and RNA nanostructures with programmable geometries
- Molecular Robotics and DNA-based molecular machines
- Nucleic acid-guided therapeutics and biologics
- Biomolecular sensing and diagnostics
- DNA-templated molecular computation and information processing

Yan's group pioneered several design strategies in creating complex DNA and RNA origami and tiling structures, enabling increasing complex nanoscale architectures with programmable curvature, mechanics, and functionality. His research also helped established DNA nanotechnology as a practical platform for applications in medicine, electronics, imaging, biosensing, and synthetic biology.

Among the notable advances from Yan's laboratory are:

- The development of DNA origami structures with complex three-dimensional curvature
- Programmable wireframe DNA origami architectures
- DNA-guided molecular walkers and autonomous nanorobots
- DNA-templated protein organization and enzyme cascade systems
- DNA nanorobot capable of targeted therapeutic responses in vivo
- RNA and DNA self-assembling systems for intracellular engineering
- DNA-templated PROTAC systems for programmable protein degradation

The Yan lab describes its mission as using "nature's design rules as inspiration to expand the frontiers of biomedicine, materials science, and nanotechnology". The group combines molecular design, molecular programming, directed molecular evolution, and systems engineering to create intelligent materials and molecular machines with atomic-scale precision.

== Publications and impact ==
Yan has authored more than 240 scientific publications, including influential papers published in Nature, Science, Nature Nanotechnology, Nature Biotechnology, Nature Chemistry, Journal of the American Chemical Society, and Angew Chem Int Ed, etc. He has consistently been recognized as a Highly Cited Researcher by Clarivate Web of Science. His work has had a transformative influence on the fields of DNA nanotechnology, molecular programming, and nanoscale engineering. Many of the tools, concepts, and assembly strategies developed in his laboratory are now foundational methods used across the global DNA nanotechnology community.

== Honors and awards ==
Yan's scientific achievement have earned broad international recognition across chemistry, nanotechnology, biomolecular engineering, and translational medicine. His honors reflect both foundation scientific innovation and transformative real-world impact.

Major distinctions include:

- Elected Fellow, European Academy of Sciences and Arts (2026)
- Regents Professor, Arizona State University (2025)
- Elected Fellow, European Academy of Sciences (2024)
- Humboldt Research Award, Alexander von Humboldt Foundation (2023)
- Elected Fellow of the American Institute for Medical and Biological Engineering (2023)
- Elected Fellow of the National Academy of Inventors (2022)
- Feynman Prize in Nanotechnology, Experimental Category, Foresight Institute (2020)
- Elected Fellow, American Association for the Advancement of Science (2019)
- Fast Company 100 Most Creative People in Business (2019)
- Contribution Award, International Meeting on DNA Nanotechnology (2017)
- RRozenberg Tulip Award in DNA Computing (2013)
- NIH Director's Transformative Research Award (2012)
- Arizona Technology Enterprise Achievement Award (2014)
- Arizona State University Promotion and Tenure Faculty Exemplar (2008)
- Sloan Research Fellowship (2008)
