= Carlo Montemagno =

American engineer (1956–2018)

- Born: August 7, 1956; New York City, US
- Died: October 11, 2018 (aged 62); St. Louis, Missouri, US
- Education: Cornell University, Pennsylvania State University, University of Notre Dame
- Awards: Feynman Prize in Nanotechnology (2003); Earth Award Grand Prize; CNBC Business Top 10 Green Innovators award Bill & Melinda Gates Grand Challenge Winner
- Scientific career
- Fields: Biomedical Engineering, Nanotechnology, Bionanotechnology, Molecular nanotechnology
- Workplaces: University of California, Los Angeles, Cornell University, University of Chicago, University of Alberta, Argonne National Laboratory, University of Cincinnati, Southern Illinois University Carbondale
- Doctoral advisor: William Gray

Carlo Montemagno (August 7, 1956 – October 11, 2018) was an American engineer and expert in nanotechnology and biomedical engineering, focusing on futuristic technologies to create interdisciplinary solutions for grand challenges in health, energy and the environment. He has been considered one of the pioneers of bionanotechnology and molecular nanotechnology. Some of his fundamental contributions include the development of biomolecular motors for powering inorganic nanodevices while at Cornell and muscle-driven self-assembled nanodevices while at UCLA.

== Academic career ==
Montemagno received his bachelor's degree in agricultural and biological engineering from Cornell University in New York, his master's degree in Petroleum and Natural Gas Engineering from Pennsylvania State University, and his doctoral degree in civil engineering and geological sciences from the University of Notre Dame in Indiana.

Montemagno died in office while serving as the chancellor of Southern Illinois University Carbondale. Right before moving to SIU, he directed the interdisciplinary Ingenuity Lab at the University of Alberta in Edmonton, Canada. He also served as the director of the biomaterials program for the Canadian Research Council's National Institute for Nanotechnology as well as a strategic research chair in intelligent nanosystems for the National Research Council. Before joining the University of Alberta, he was the founding dean of the college of engineering and applied sciences at the University of Cincinnati.

His previous academic appointments include being the founding chair of the department of bioengineering and biomedical engineering, co-director of the NASA Center for Cell Mimetic Space Exploration, and associate director of the California Nanosystems Institute at the University of California, Los Angeles, the director of the biomedical engineering graduate program at Cornell University and the group leader in environmental physics at the Argonne National Laboratory in Chicago. He also served in the U. S. Navy Civil Engineer Corps for nine years, leaving with the rank of lieutenant.

=== Controversies ===
In 2018, investigative journalists reported that Montemagno demanded the hiring of his daughter and son-in-law at each of the three universities he worked at. These deals included lowering job qualification requirements to enable his son-in-law to become eligible for the position, allowing Montemagno to write the job description himself, and for an interest-free loan to buy a house. Furthermore, while at the University of Alberta, Montemagno supervised his nephew for a doctoral degree, which was characterized as unheard of by an ethics expert at York University.

Simultaneously, Southern Illinois University student paper The Daily Egyptian reported on interviews with 11 people who had worked with Montemagno in Edmonton, who cited disorganization, favouritism, and a culture of fear within Montemagno's Ingenuity Lab.

== Awards and honors ==
Throughout his career, Montemagno received many awards for his scientific innovations, including the Feynman Prize in Nanotechnology (for creating single molecule biological motors with nano-scale silicon devices), the Earth Award Grand Prize (for cell-free artificial photosynthesis with over 95% efficiency) and the CNBC Business Top 10 Green Innovators award (for Aquaporin Membrane water purification and desalination technology). He was named a Bill & Melinda Gates Grand Challenge Winner for his development of an oral vaccine delivery system that increased vaccine stability. He was a Fellow for the American Institute for Medical and Biomedical Engineering, the American Academy for Nanomedicine and the NASA Institute for Advanced Concepts.

== Personal life ==
Carlo Montemagno was born in 1956 to Gasper Patrick and Jacqueline Ann (Graham) Montemagno in Bronx, NY. He married Pamela Ann LaCava in 1976, and they remained married until his death. He was an avid reader and collector of books and an aerobatic and commercial pilot. He also enjoyed dog sports, falconry, ice climbing, science fiction, war movies and disco. Montemagno died in 2018 in St. Louis due to complications arising from cancer.
