= Christopher Voigt =

American bioengineer

Christopher A. Voigt
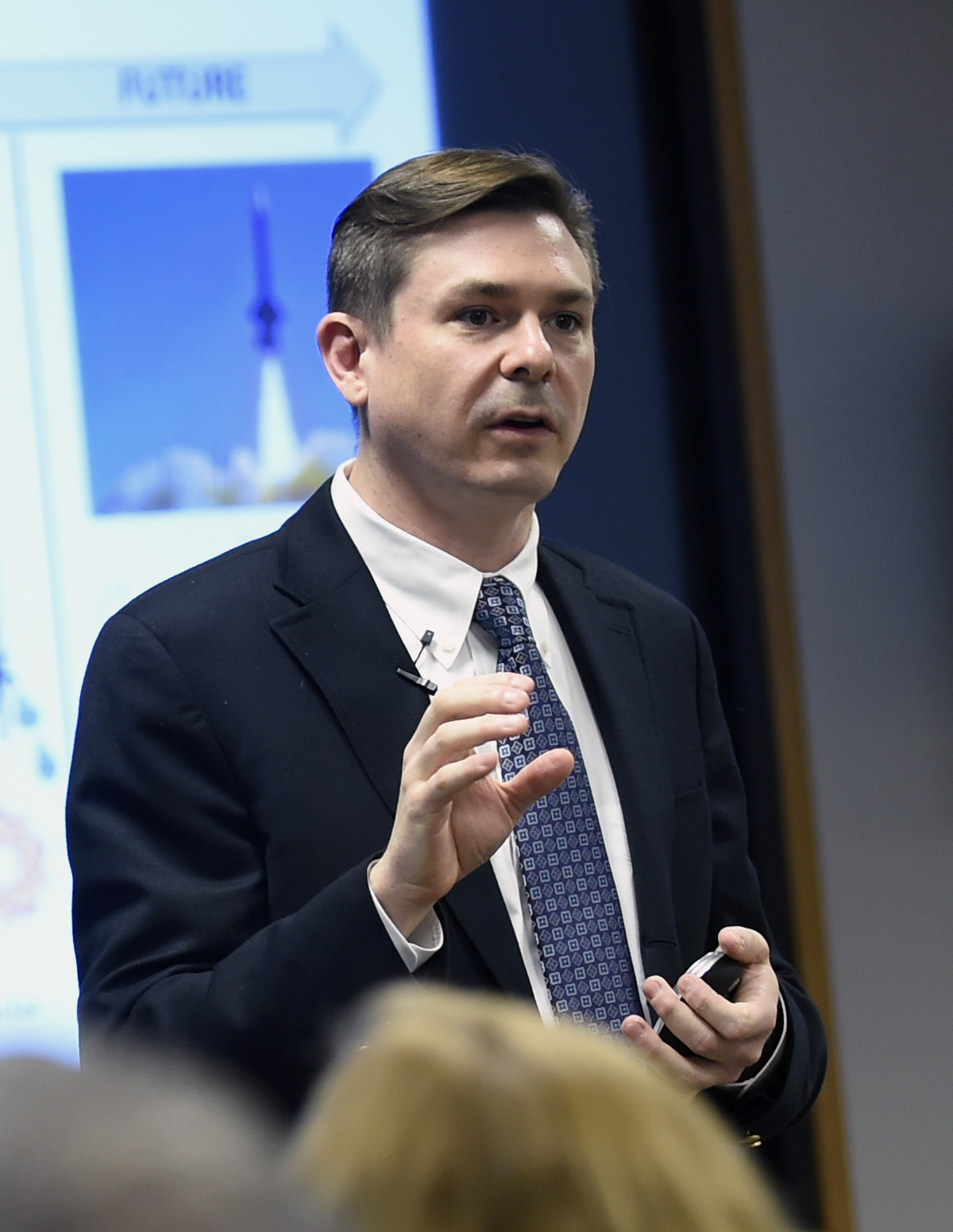
- Christopher Voigt at the Office of Naval Research, 2016
- Born: Ann Arbor, Michigan, U.S.
- Education: University of Michigan; California Institute of Technology; University of California - Berkeley
- Scientific career
- Fields: Synthetic Biology, Biotechnology, Genetic Engineering, Biological Engineering
- Workplaces: Massachusetts Institute of Technology, UCSF
- Doctoral advisor: Zhen-Gang Wang, Frances Arnold, Stephen Mayo, Adam P Arkin (Postdoctoral)

Christopher Voigt is an American synthetic biologist, molecular biophysicist, and engineer who is professor and department head of Biological Engineering at MIT.

== Career ==
Voigt is the Daniel I.C. Wang Professor of Advanced Biotechnology in the Department of Biological Engineering at Massachusetts Institute of Technology (MIT). He works in the developing field of synthetic biology. He is the co-director of the Synthetic Biology Center at MIT and the co-founder of the MIT-Broad Foundry.

His research interests focus on the programming of cells to perform coordinated and complex tasks for applications in medicine, agriculture, and industry. His works include:

- Design of genetic circuits in bacteria, yeast and mammalian cells. Encoded in DNA, these circuits implement computational operations inside of cells.
- Software to program living cells (Cello), which is based on principles from electronic design automation and is based on Verilog.
- Genetically encoded sensors that enables cells to respond to chemicals, environmental cues, and colored light.
- Computational tools to design precision genetic parts, based on biophysics, bioinformatics, and machine learning.
- Therapeutic bacteria to navigate the human body and identify and correct disease states.
- Redesign of the nitrogen fixation gene cluster to facilitate its transfer between organisms and control with synthetic sensors and circuits.
- Pharmaceutical discovery from large databases of DNA sequences, including the human gut microbiome, though high-throughput pathway recoding and DNA synthesis.
- Harnessing cells to produce materials, including spider silk, nylon-6, and DNA nanomaterials.

In addition, he is the:

- Founding Member of the National Science Foundation-funded Synthetic Biology Engineering Research Center (SynBERC), renamed the Engineering Biology Research Center (EBRC).
- Editor-in-Chief of ACS Synthetic Biology.
- Co-founder of the companies Asimov (cellular programming) and Pivot Biotechnologies (agriculture).
- Co-founder of the Synthetic Biology: Engineering Evolution and Design (SEED) Conference Series.
- Chair of the SAB for the Dutch chemical company DSM.

His former students have founded Asimov (mammalian synthetic biology), De Novo DNA (computational design), Bolt Threads (spider silk-based textiles), Pivot Bio (agriculture), and Industrial Microbes (methane consuming organisms).
