= Stephen L. Mayo =

Professor of Biology and Chemistry

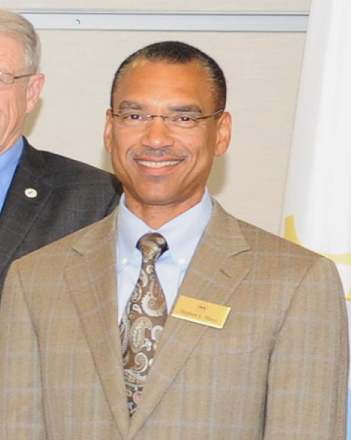
- Mayo at National Science Board 2013
- Born: 1961 (age 64–65)
- Citizenship: American
- Education: California Institute of Technology
- Known for: Protein design
- Scientific career
- Fields: Biophysics, structural biology
- Workplaces: California Institute of Technology
- Academic advisors: Harry B. Gray, Bill Goddard
- Notable students: Christopher Voigt
- Website: www.mayo.caltech.edu

Stephen L. Mayo (born 1961) is a professor at the California Institute of Technology, where he is the William K. Bowes Jr. Leadership Chair in the Division of Biology and Biological Engineering, and the Bren Professor of Biology and Chemistry. His research focuses on structural biology and the development of computational methods for protein design. Mayo was elected to the United States National Academy of Sciences in 2004 and was appointed to a six-year term on the National Science Board in 2013.

== Early life and education ==
One of three sons, Mayo was born in 1961. His father had a career in the Air Force and his mother worked as a teacher's aide. Mayo attended Pennsylvania State University as an undergraduate and received a B.S. in chemistry in 1983. He received his Ph.D. from Caltech in 1987, after working on several projects primarily with Harry B. Gray and Bill Goddard. While a graduate student, Mayo co-founded a company, Molecular Simulations, Inc., which would later become Accelrys (now Biov a). After a stint as a postdoctoral fellow at the University of California, Berkeley, Mayo spent two years working at MSI full-time before taking up another postdoc position at Stanford University.

== Academic career ==
Mayo joined the Caltech faculty in 1992. In 1994 he was Awarded the Searle Scholar Award. A 1995 report identified him as the only black faculty member at Caltech, which had about 300 faculty at the time. He earned tenure in 1998, the first black faculty member to do so at Caltech.

In 2004, Mayo was elected to the United States National Academy of Sciences, at a relatively young and impressive age for that honor. He served as Vice Provost for Research from 2007 to 2010, when he became chair of the biology division. In 2012 he was named the inaugural William K. Bowes Jr. Leadership Chair. President Obama nominated Mayo in 2013 to a six-year term on the National Science Board, making Caltech the only institution with two board representatives. (The other is astronomer Anneila Sargent, appointed in 2011.)

== Entrepreneurship ==
Mayo co-founded the software company Molecular Simulations, Inc (MSI) while in graduate school, worked there full-time for two years, and continued consulting work thereafter. The company later became Accelrys (now Biovia). In 1997 Mayo and a former student co-founded Xencor, a biotechnology company based on protein design of antibodies. Mayo is also a co-founder and current scientific advisory board member of Protabit.

== Research ==
Mayo's research group focuses on the study of protein design, including development of computational methods and software tools to facilitate the design of proteins for specific uses, such as development of antibodies and red fluorescent proteins, commonly used as research reagents. Mayo's group is credited with the first computational design from physical principles and successful experimental validation of a protein sequence that folds into a designed structure. In 2008 Mayo became one of the inaugural awardees of the Department of Defense National Security Science and Engineering Faculty Fellowship to use protein design techniques to develop antiviral compounds.

== Personal life ==
Mayo was once a nationally ranked hang glider pilot, and credits his interest in flying to his father's Air Force career. Mayo and his wife, a science writer, have two children and enjoy sailing as a hobby.
