= Dean Astumian =

American physical chemist

- Education: University of Texas at Arlington
- Awards: Feynman Prize for Theory (2011)

Raymond Dean Astumian is an American chemical and theoretical biophysicist. He is a professor at the University of Maine.

== Biography ==
Astumian earned a bachelor's degree, followed by a master's degree in chemistry from the University of Texas at Arlington in 1978 and 1982. He was a Japanese Ministry of Education (Monbusho) Fellow in 1979-1980 in the lab of Tatsuya Yasunaga. He obtained a doctorate in the lab of Zoltan Schelly in mathematical science and physical chemistry from the University of Texas at Arlington in 1983. Astumian is a professor at the University of Maine.

In 2000, he was elected a fellow of the American Physical Society "[f]or fundamental contributions to understanding the thermodynamics and mechanism of transduction of energy from a non-equilibrium chemical reaction to drive directed transport by molecular motors and pumps." Astumian won the Humbolt Research Award from the Alexander von Humboldt Foundation in 2009 for, "very important contributions to the theory of Brownian motors and the influence of thermal noise on biological systems.". He won the 2011 Feynman Prize for Theory.. In 2016, he was elected a fellow of the American Association for the Advancement of Science..
