= Emily A. Carter =

American chemist

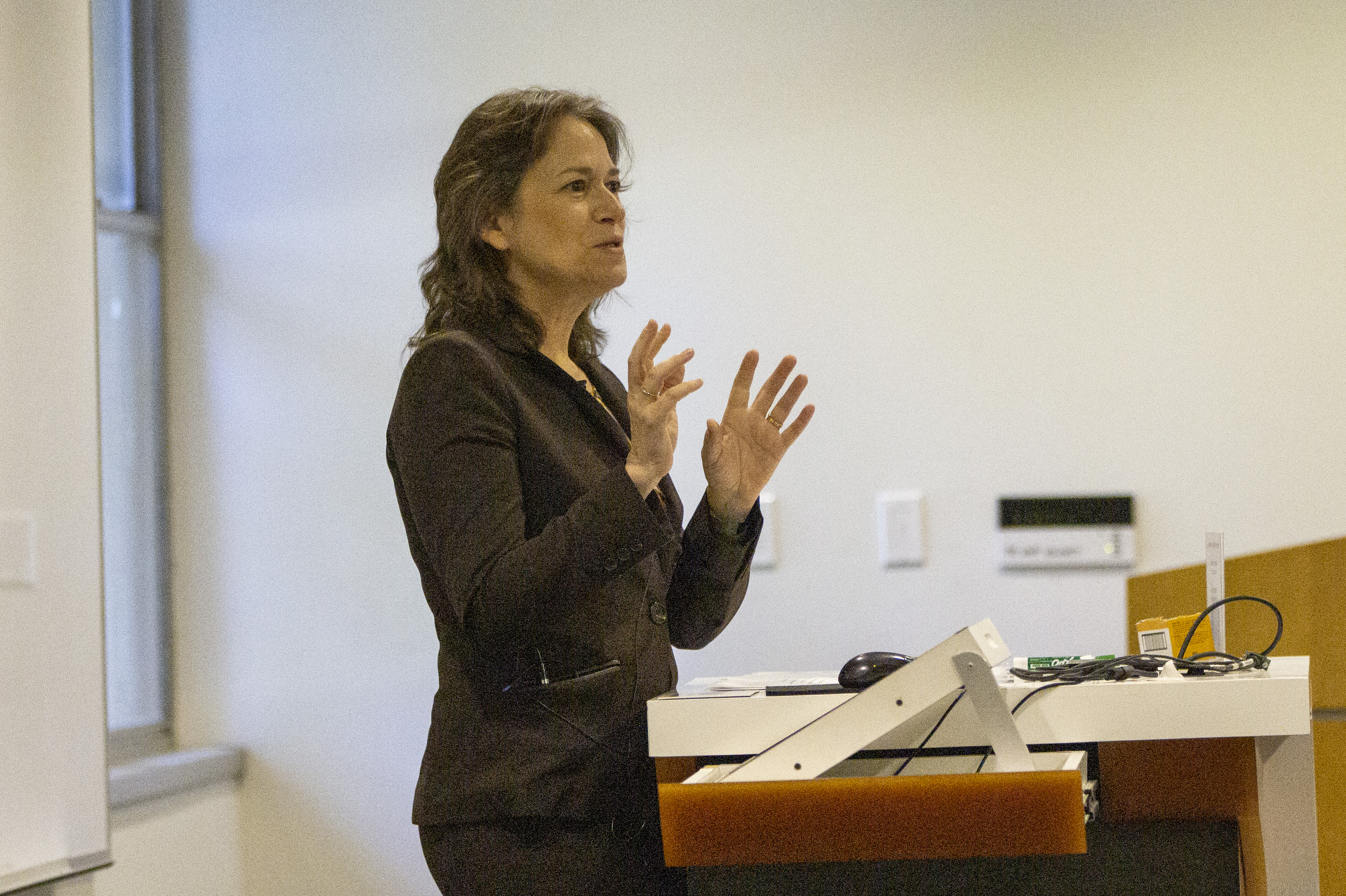
- Carter in 2019
- Born: Los Gatos, California
- Education: UC, Berkeley (BS); Caltech (PhD)
- Scientific career
- Fields: Physical chemistry
- Workplaces: Princeton Plasma Physics Lab; Princeton University; University of California, Los Angeles
- Thesis: Finesse in Quantum Chemistry: Accurate Energetics Relevant for Reaction Mechanisms (1987)
- Doctoral advisor: William Andrew Goddard III
- Doctoral students: Todd Martínez
- Website: https://www.pppl.gov/research/applied-materials-and-sustainability-sciences

Emily Ann Carter is the Gerhard R. Andlinger Professor in Energy and the Environment and a professor of Mechanical and Aerospace Engineering (MAE), the Andlinger Center for Energy and the Environment (ACEE), and Applied and Computational Mathematics at Princeton University. She is also a member of the executive management team at the Princeton Plasma Physics Laboratory (PPPL), serving as Senior Strategic Advisor and Associate Laboratory Director for Applied Materials and Sustainability Sciences.

The author of over 475 publications and patents, Carter has delivered over 600 invited and plenary lectures worldwide and has served on advisory boards spanning a wide range of disciplines. Among other honors, Carter is an elected foreign member of The Royal Society (2024), and fellow of the Royal Society of Chemistry (2022), the National Academy of Inventors (2014), the American Academy of Arts and Sciences (2008), the Institute of Physics (2004), American Association for the Advancement of Science (2000), the American Vacuum Society (1995), the American Physical Society (1994), and the American Chemical Society. She is also an elected member of the European Academy of Sciences (2020), the National Academy of Engineering (2016), International Academy of Quantum Molecular Science (2009), the National Academy of Sciences (2008).

== Biography ==
Emily Carter received a Bachelor of Science in chemistry from the University of California, Berkeley, in 1982 (graduating Phi Beta Kappa). She earned her PhD in physical chemistry in 1987 from the California Institute of Technology, where she worked with William Andrew Goddard III, studying homogeneous and heterogeneous catalysis. During her postdoc at the University of Colorado, Boulder, she worked with James T. Hynes carrying out studies on the dynamics of (photo-induced) electron transfer in solution. She also worked with James Hynes, Giovanni Ciccotti, and Ray Kapral to develop the widely used Blue Moon ensemble, a rare-event sampling method for condensed matter simulations.

From 1988 to 2004, she held professorships in chemistry and materials science and engineering at the University of California, Los Angeles. During those years, she was the Dr. Lee's visiting research fellow in the Sciences at Christ Church, Oxford (1996), a visiting scholar in the department of physics at Harvard University (1999), and a visiting associate in aeronautics at the California Institute of Technology (2001). She moved to Princeton University in 2004. In 2006, she was named Arthur W. Marks '19 Professor. From 2009 to 2014, she was co-director of the Department of Energy Frontier Research Center on Combustion Science. She became the founding director of the Andlinger Center for Energy and the Environment in 2010, Gerhard R. Andlinger Professor in 2011, and dean of the school of engineering and applied science in 2016. After a national search, Prof. Carter served from 2016 to 2019 as Dean of the Princeton University School of Engineering and Applied Science and the Gerhard R. Andlinger Professor in Energy and the Environment. She was also a professor in the department of mechanical and aerospace engineering and the Program in Applied and Computational Mathematics at Princeton University. She was an associated faculty member in the Andlinger Center for Energy and the Environment, the department of chemistry, the department of chemical and biological engineering, the Princeton Institute for Computational Science and Engineering (PICSciE), the High Meadows Environmental Institute (HMEI), and the Princeton Institute for the Science and Technology of Materials (PRISM). She was the founding director of the Andlinger Center for Energy and the Environment from 2010 to 2016. She served as UCLA's Executive Vice Chancellor and Provost (EVCP) from 2019 to 2021 and was Distinguished Professor of Chemical and Biomolecular Engineering. She is currently a member of the executive management team at the Princeton Plasma Physics Laboratory (PPPL), serving as Senior Strategic Advisor and Associate Laboratory Director for Applied Materials and Sustainability Sciences.

== Research ==
External videos
- "Andlinger Center director Emily Carter lays out strategic vision for energy research", Princeton Engineering
- "Mechanisms of Photoelectrochemical Reduction of Carbon Dioxide", Scuola Normale Superiore
- "Quantum Mechanics and the Future of the Planet", Institute for Pure and Applied Mathematics

Carter has made significant contributions to theoretical and computational chemistry and physics, including the development of ab initio quantum chemistry methods, methods for accurate description of molecules at the quantum level, and an algorithm for identifying transitional states in chemical reactions. She pioneered the combination of ab initio quantum chemistry with kinetic Monte Carlo simulations (KMC), molecular dynamics (MD), and quasi-continuum solid mechanics simulations relevant to the study of surfaces and interfaces of materials. She has extensively investigated the chemical and mechanical causes and mechanisms of failure in materials such as silicon, germanium, iron and steel, and proposed methods for protecting materials from failure.

She has developed fast methods for orbital-free density functional theory (OF-DFT) that can be applied to large numbers of atoms as well as embedded correlated wavefunction theory for the study of local condensed matter electronic structure. This work has relevance to the understanding of photoelectrocatalysis. Her current research focuses on the understanding and design of materials for sustainable energy. Applications include conversion of sunlight to electricity, clean and efficient use of biofuels and solid oxide fuel cells, and development of materials for use in fuel-efficient vehicles and fusion reactors.

Carter's research is supported by multiple grants from the U.S. Department of Defense and the Department of Energy. She was elected as a member into the National Academy of Engineering (2016) for the development of quantum chemistry computational methods for the design of molecules and materials for sustainable energy.

== Selected publications ==
- D. V. Potapenko, Z. Chen, S. Xu, X. Yang, I. Waluyo, A. Gilman, E. A. Carter, and B. E. Koel, "Methanol Adsorption and Dissociation on GaP(110) Studied by Ambient Pressure X-ray Photoelectron Spectroscopy," Surface Science, 758, 122743 (2025). Part of the special issue and chosen as the cover article in "60 years of Surface Science: Achievements and Perspectives."
- J. M. P. Martirez, S. Kurdziel, and E. A. Carter, "First-Principles Insights into the Thermocatalytic Cracking of Ammonia-Hydrogen Blends on Fe(110). 2. Kinetics," Journal of Physical Chemistry C, 129, 6697 (2025).
- A. D. Lele, Z. Shi, S. Khetan, E. A. Carter, J. M. P. Martirez, and Y. Ju, "Machine-learned force field for molecular dynamics simulation of non-equilibrium ammonia synthesis on iron catalysts," Journal of Physical Chemistry C, 129, 4937 (2025).
- J.-N. Boyn and E. A. Carter, "Elucidating and contrasting the mechanisms for Mg and Ca sulfate ion-pair formation with multi-level embedded quantum mechanics/molecular dynamics simulations," Journal of Chemical Physics, 161, 224501 (2024).
- E. A. Carter, S. Atsumi, M. Byron, J. Chen, S. Comello, M. Fan, B, Freeman, M. Fry, S. Jordaan, H. Mahgerefteh, A.-H. Park, J. Powell, A. R. Ramirez, V. Sick, S. Stewart, J. Trembly, J. Yang, J. Yuan, C. Wise, and E. Zeitler, "Carbon Utilization Infrastructure, Markets, and Research and Development: A Final Report," National Academies of Sciences, Engineering, and Medicine (NASEM). Washington DC: The National Academies Press. ISBN 978-0-309-71775-5 (2024).
- E. A. Carter, "Our Role in Solving Global Challenges: An Opinion," J. Am. Chem. Soc., 146, 21193-21195 (2024).
- X. Wen, J.-N. Boyn, J. M. P. Martirez, Q. Zhao, and E. A. Carter, "Strategies to obtain reliable energy landscapes from embedded multireference correlated wavefunction methods for surface reactions," Journal of Chemical Theory and Computation, 20, 6037-6048 (2024).
- B. Bobell, J.-N. Boyn, J. M. P. Martirez, and E. A. Carter, "Modeling Bicarbonate Formation in an Alkaline Solution with Multi-Level Quantum Mechanics/Molecular Dynamics Simulations," Molecular Physics Special Issue in Honour of Giovanni Ciccotti, e2375370 (2024).
- X. Wen, J. M. P. Martirez, and E. A. Carter, "Plasmon-driven ammonia decomposition on Pd(111): Hole transfer's role in changing rate-limiting steps," ACS Catalysis, 14, 9539 (2024).
- Z. Wei, J. M. P. Martirez, and E. A. Carter, "First-Principles Insights into the Thermodynamics of Variable-Temperature Ammonia Synthesis on Transition-Metal-Doped Cu (100) and (111)," ACS Energy Lett., 9, 3012 (2024).
- A. G. Rajan, J. M. P. Martirez, and E. A. Carter, "Strongly Facet-Dependent Activity of Iron-Doped β-Nickel Oxyhydroxide for the Oxygen Evolution Reaction," Phys. Chem. Chem. Phys. 25th Anniversary Special Issue, 26, 14721 (2024).
- J.-N. Boyn and E. A. Carter, "Probing pH-Dependent Dehydration Dynamics of Mg and Ca Cations in Aqueous Solutions with Multi-Level Quantum Mechanics/Molecular Dynamics Simulations," J. Am. Chem. Soc., 145, 20462 (2023).
- R. B. Wexler, G. S. Gautam, R. Bell, S. Shulda, N. A. Strange, J. A. Trindell, J. D. Sugar, E. Nygren, S. Sainio, A. H. McDaniel, D. Ginley, E. A. Carter, and E. B. Stechel, "Multiple and nonlocal cation redox in Ca–Ce–Ti–Mn oxide perovskites for solar thermochemical applications," Energy Environ. Sci., 16, 2550 (2023).
- J. Cai, Q. Zhao, W.-Y. Hsu, C. Choi, J. M. P. Martirez, C. Chen, J. Huang, E. A. Carter, and Y. Huang, "Highly Selective Electrochemical Reduction of CO2 into Methane on Nanotwinned Cu," J. Am. Chem. Soc., 145, 9136 (2023).
- Y. Yuan, L. Zhou, J. L. Bao, J. Zhou, A. Bayles, L. Yuan, M. Lou, M. Lou, S. Khatiwada, H. Robatjazi, E. A. Carter, P. Nordlander, and N. J. Halas, "Earth-abundant photocatalyst for H2 generation from NH3 with light-emitting diode illumination," Science, 378, 889 (2022).
- J. M. P. Martirez and E. A. Carter, "First-Principles Insights into the Thermocatalytic Cracking of Ammonia-Hydrogen Blends on Fe(110). 1. Thermodynamics," J. Phys. Chem. C, 126, 19733 (2022). (Virtual Special Issue: Honoring Michael R. Berman)
- E. A. Carter, "Autobiography of Emily A. Carter," J. Phys. Chem. A, 125, 1671 (2021); J. Phys. Chem. C, 125, 4333 (2021).

== Recent awards and honors ==
- 2019 – John Scott Award, Board of City Trusts, Philadelphia, PA
- 2019 – Camille & Henry Dreyfus Lectureship, University of Basel, Switzerland
- 2019 – Inaugural WiSE Presidential Distinguished Lecturer, University of Southern California
- 2019 – 18th NCCR MARVEL Distinguished Lecturer, L'École Polytechnique Fédérale de Lausanne (EPFL), Switzerland
- 2019 – Graduate Mentoring Award, McGraw Center for Teaching and Learning, Princeton University
- 2019 – Distinguished Alumni Award, California Institute of Technology
- 2019 – Eyring Lecturer in Molecular Sciences, Arizona State University
- 2019 – Mildred Dresselhaus Memorial Lecturer, Ras Al Khaimah Centre for Advanced Materials, United Arab Emirates
- 2019 – Dow Foundation Distinguished Lecturer, University of California, Santa Barbara
- 2020 – Brumley D. Pritchett Lecturer, Georgia Institute of Technology, School of Materials Science and Engineering
- 2020 – Member, European Academy of Sciences
- 2020 – UCLA Chemistry & Biochemistry Distinguished Lecturer, University of California, Los Angeles
- 2021 – Materials Theory Award, Materials Research Society
- 2022 – Fellow, Royal Society of Chemistry
- 2022 – Paint Branch Distinguished Lecturer in Applied Physics, University of Maryland, Institute for Research in Electronics and Applied Physics
- 2022 – Richard S. H. Mah Lecturer, Northwestern University, Department of Chemical and Biological Engineering
- 2022 – Harrison Shull Distinguished Lecturer, Indiana University Bloomington, Department of Chemistry
- 2023 – Gilbert Newton Lewis Memorial Lecturer, University of California, Berkeley
- 2023 – Robert S. Mulliken Award, University of Chicago
- 2023 – 27th John Stauffer Lecturer in Chemistry, Stanford University
- 2024 – William H. Nichols Medal, American Chemical Society (New York Section)
- 2024 – Foreign Member of the Royal Society
- 2024 – Marsha I. Lester Award for Exemplary Impact in Physical Chemistry, American Chemical Society, Physical Chemistry Division
- 2024 – Annabelle Lee Lecturer, VA Tech, Blacksburg
- 2025 – Satish Saxena Distinguished Seminar Lecturer in Chemical Engineering, University of Illinois Chicago
- 2025 - Willis H. Flygare Memorial Lecturer at the University of Illinois, Urbana-Champaign

== News stories related to Carter ==
- "2024 Marsha I. Lester Award for Exemplary Impact in Physical Chemistry" — American Chemical Society, Physical Chemistry Section (August 2024)
- "Emily Carter elected to the Royal Society" — The Royal Society (May 16, 2024)
- "PPPL Envisions a Future of Fusion Energy Solutions and Plasma Science Progress" — US 1 News (May 15, 2024)
- "Andlinger Center meeting spotlights next-decade technologies and design approaches for the clean energy transition" — Princeton University Engineering (Dec 06, 2023)
- "Dr. Emily Carter: International Leader in Sustainability Science at Princeton University" — Girl Power Gurus Podcast (Nov 25, 2023)
- "Ammonia fuel offers great benefits but demands careful action" — Princeton University Engineering (Nov 7, 2023); Andlinger Center for Energy and the Environment (Nov 7, 2023)
- "Is Energy Efficiency our Panacea for Power?" — Forbes (Oct 29, 2023)
- C-Change Conversation Interview with Kathleen Biggins — C-Change Conversation (May 5, 2023)
