= Klaus-Robert Müller =

German computer scientist

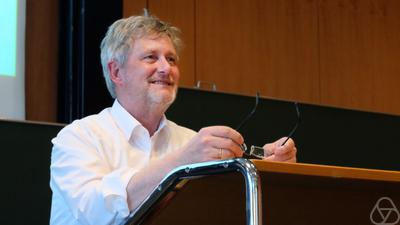
- Müller in 2026
- Born: 29 December 1964 (age 61); Karlsruhe, West Germany
- Education: University of Karlsruhe
- Known for: Machine learning; Support Vector Machines; Brain–computer interfaces
- Awards: Leibniz Prize (2026); Feynman Prize (2024)
- Scientific career
- Fields: Machine learning; Artificial intelligence; Computational neuroscience; Big data
- Workplaces: Technische Universität Berlin; University of Potsdam
- Thesis: Spärlich verbundene neuronale Netze und ihre Anwendung (Sparse neural networks and their application) (1992)
- Academic advisors: Vladimir Vapnik; Shun'ichi Amari

Klaus-Robert Müller (born 1964 in Karlsruhe, West Germany) is a German computer scientist and physicist, most noted for his work in machine learning and brain–computer interfaces.

== Career ==
Klaus-Robert Müller received his Diplom in mathematical physics and PhD in theoretical computer science from the University of Karlsruhe. Following his Ph.D. he went to Berlin as a postdoctoral fellow at GMD (German National Research Center for Computer Science) Berlin (now part of Fraunhofer Institute for Open Communication Systems), where he started building up the Intelligent Data Analysis (IDA) group.

From 1994 to 1995 he was a research fellow at Shun'ichi Amari's lab at the University of Tokyo.

1999 Müller became an associate professor for neuroinformatics at the University of Potsdam, transitioning to the full professorship for Neural Networks and Time Series Analysis in 2003. Since 2006 he holds the chair for Machine Learning at Technische Universität Berlin.

Since 2012 he holds a distinguished professorship at Korea University in Seoul. He co-founded and is co-director of the Berlin Big Data Center (BBDC) of TU Berlin.

As of 2017, 29 former doctoral or postdoctoral researchers of Klaus-Robert Müller have become full professors themselves. Bernhard Schölkopf and Alexander J. Smola were supervised by him as members of his research group.

Since 2020 he is director of the Berlin Institute for the Foundations of Learning and Data (BIFOLD), a German National AI Competence Center, and director of the European Laboratory for Learning and Intelligent Systems (ELLIS) unit Berlin.

In 2020/2021 he spent his sabbatical at Google Brain as a principal scientist.

== Research ==
Müller has contributed extensively to several major interests of machine learning, including support vector machines (SVMs) and kernel methods, and artificial neural networks. He pioneered applying new methods of pattern recognition in domains like brain–computer interfaces, using them for patients with Locked-in syndrome. He is one of the leading computer scientists affiliated with Germany.

His current research interests include:

- Statistical learning theory (Support Vector Machines, Deep Neural Networks, Boosting)
- Learning of non-stationarity data
- Fusion of structured heterogeneous multi-modal data, co-adaptation
- Applications: MEG, EEG, NIRS, ECoG, EMG, Brain Computer Interfaces, computational neuroscience, computer vision, genomic data analysis, computational chemistry and atomistic simulations, digital pathology

== Honours and awards ==
Klaus-Robert Müller was elected a fellow of the German National Academy of Sciences Leopoldina in 2012. In 2017 he was elected member of the Berlin-Brandenburg Academy of Sciences and Humanities and also external scientific member of the Max Planck Society. In 2021 he was elected member of the German Academy of Science and Engineering.

His work was honoured with several awards, including:

- 2026 Gottfried Wilhelm Leibniz Prize
- 2025 IEEE Neural Network Pioneer Award
- 2024 Feynman Prize in Nanotechnology
- 2023 Hector Fellow
- 2025, 2024, 2023, 2022, 2021, 2020, and 2019 Clarivate Highly Cited Researcher
- 2017 Vodafone Innovations Award 2017
- 2014 Science Prize of Berlin 2014 by the Governing Mayor of Berlin
- 2014 European Research Council Panel Consolidator Grants
- 2009 Best Paper award by IEEE Engineering in Medicine and Biology Society EMBS
- 2006 SEL-ALCATEL Research Prize for Technical Communication
- 1999 Olympus Award for Pattern Recognition

== Books ==
- with Holzinger, Andreas; et al., eds. (2022). xxAI – Beyond Explainable Artificial Intelligence. Lecture Notes in Computer Science. Vol. 13200. Springer Cham. doi:10.1007/978-3-031-04083-2. ISBN 978-3-031-04082-5.
- with Schütt, Kristof T.; et al., eds. (2020). Machine Learning Meets Quantum Physics. Lecture Notes in Physics. Vol. 968. Springer Cham. doi:10.1007/978-3-030-40245-7. ISBN 978-3-030-40244-0. S2CID 242406994.
- with Samek, Wojciech; et al., eds. (2019). Explainable AI: Interpreting, Explaining and Visualizing Deep Learning. Lecture Notes in Computer Science. Vol. 11700. Springer Cham. doi:10.1007/978-3-030-28954-6. ISBN 978-3-030-28953-9.
- with Montavon, Grégoire; et al., eds. (2012). Neural Networks: Tricks of the Trade. Lecture Notes in Computer Science. Vol. 7700 (2nd ed.). Springer Berlin, Heidelberg. doi:10.1007/978-3-642-35289-8. ISBN 978-3-642-35288-1. S2CID 39578794.
