= Allozyne =

Coordinates: 47.63415°N 122.326789°W

Allozyne Inc.

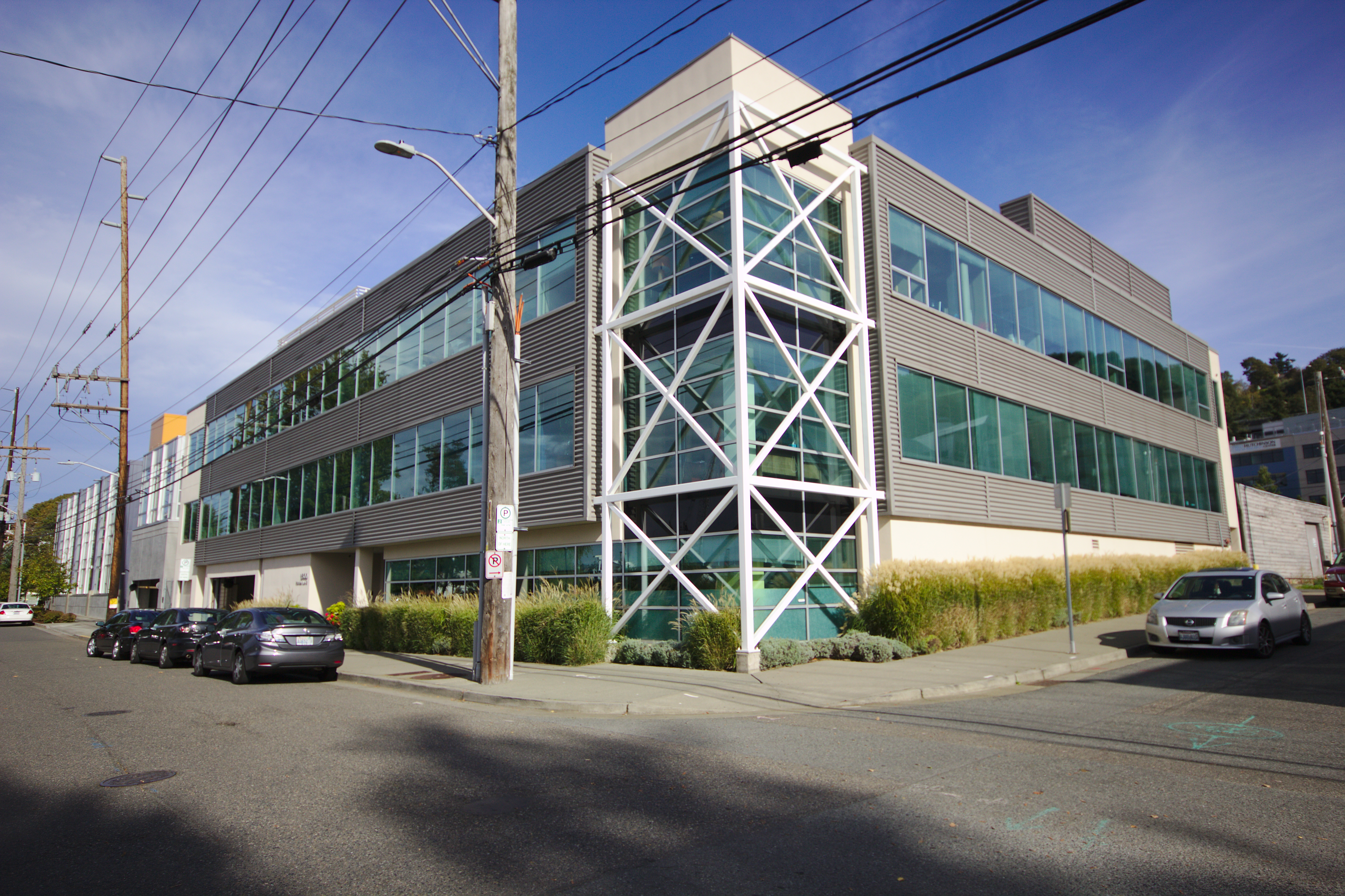
- Allozyne facility in the Eastlake neighborhood of Seattle
- Type: Private
- Industry: Biotechnology
- Founded: 2005 with $50 million capital raised to date from MPM Capital, OVP Venture Partners and ARCH
- Founder: William A. Goddard III, David A. Tirrell, Dee Datta,PhD
- Defunct: 2014
- Headquarters: Seattle, Washington, USA
- Website: allozyne.com

Allozyne was a clinical stage biotechnology company headquartered in Seattle's biotech and high tech innovation corridor. Allozyne was founded in 2005 by California Institute of Technology researchers, and was incubated by Accelerator Corporation. Its lead product candidate, AZ01, is a long acting interferon beta for the treatment of the relapsing remitting form of multiple sclerosis, a chronic degenerative disease characterized by demyelination of nerve fibers leading to severe nerve damage and increasing disability. Multiple sclerosis is estimated to affect 400,000 individuals in the US alone and 2.5 million worldwide. AZ01 is currently undergoing Phase I clinical trials in the US. Preclinical data indicates that AZ01 has the potential to be dosed once monthly compared to the current standard of care dosed anywhere from once daily to once per week.

Allozyne's technology also enables the development of next generation antibody-drug conjugates (ADCs). This approach results in homogeneous ADC products that are stably conjugated.

In 2014, Allozyne was acquired by MedImmune, based on its ADC technology. Financial terms of the transaction were not disclosed.

== Platform and therapeutic focus ==
Allozyne has a therapeutic focus on chronic central nervous system and autoimmune diseases such as multiple sclerosis and Crohn's disease. Their two platforms, Caesar and Vigenère, enable the creation of novel therapeutics that address unmet medical need associated with these diseases.

The names of the two platforms were inspired by the two encryption techniques used prior to, and during, World War II known as the Caesar cipher and Vigenère cipher. These platforms, like historical ciphering technologies, involve changes to the way messages are interpreted. These changes include modifications to the cellular machinery of both E. coli and mammalian cells so that the information encrypted in their DNA can introduce a variety of protein building blocks beyond the 20 that are found in all proteins throughout nature. This process of biological encryption has come to be known as "biociphering". Additional available building blocks enable the creation more advanced protein therapeutics. The ability to customize the intrinsic properties and location of the 21st amino acid, allows for a variety of bioconjugation chemistries to be directed to any specific location within the protein. These biociphering platforms have opened the door to new protein therapeutic configurations including antibody-toxin, antibody-antibody, long acting as well as others. Application of these platforms to the development of protein based therapeutics enable therapeutics that address areas of unmet medical need. The first application of this technology was used to incorporate a variety of methionine analogs into human recombinant interferon beta. One azide containing methionine analog was selected for its compatibility with a bioconjugation chemistry developed by Nobel Laureate, K. Barry Sharpless of The Scripps Research Institute, known as "Click chemistry This chemistry enabled the engineering of a long acting form of human interferon beta by conjugation to a half-life extending moiety known as polyethylene glycol (PEG). Results were presented at the 2007 national ACS meeting. On July 15, 2010, Allozybe announced the signing of an exclusive license agreement with The Scripps Research Institute for Click chemistry.
