= Anne-Sophie Duwez =

- Occupation: Professor at the University of Liege.
- Notable awards: 2017 Triennial Prize Agathon-De Potter, 2021 Feynman Prize in Nanotechnology for Experimental Category

Anne-Sophie Duwez is a Belgian scientist and professor in the department of chemistry at the University of Liege. She is well known for her work in advanced atomic force microscopy (AFM) and single-molecule force spectroscopy, leading to her receipt of the 2021 Feynman Prize in Nanotechnology in the Experimental Category.

== Education ==
Duwez pursued her doctoral studies at the University of Namur, ultimately graduating with a Ph.D in chemistry in 1997.

== Career ==
Following the completion of her education at the University of Namur, Duwez worked as a postdoctoral researcher for the National Fund for Scientific Research (FNRS) at the University of Louvain. She continued her nanotechnology research until her tenure at Louvain ended in 2002. In 2002, she briefly transitioned to be a visiting scientist role at the Max Planck Institute in Mainz, Germany until leaving in 2003.

In 2006, Duwez returned to the University of Louvain as a professor in the department of chemistry. During this time, she received an Incentive Grant for Scientific Research from the National Fund for Scientific Research. Duwez utilized this grant to create a laboratory dedicated to research in advanced atomic force microscopy (AFM) techniques, which later became known as the NanoChem group; she is the head of the group.

== Achievements and Awards ==
In 2017, she received the 2017 Triennial Prize Agathon-De Potter for her chemistry research, given by the Royal Academy of Sciences, Letters, and Arts of Belgium. Later, she received the 2021 Feynman Prize in Nanotechnology in the experimental category for her research utilizing atomic force microscopy (AFM) technologies to investigate the operation and function of synthetic molecules and interface single molecules.
