= Yue Qi =

Computational materials scientist

- Citizenship: United States
- Education: Tsinghua University; California Institute of Technology
- Known for: Molecular Modelling
- Awards: Feynman Prize in Nanotechnology
- Scientific career
- Fields: Materials science
- Institutions: California Institute of Technology, General Motors Research Laboratories, Michigan State University, Brown University

Yue Qi is a Chinese-born American nanotechnologist and physicist who specializes in computational materials scientist at Brown University. She won the 1999 Feynman Prize in Nanotechnology for Theory along with William Goddard and Tahir Cagin for "work in modeling the operation of molecular machine designs."

== Education ==
Qi graduated from Tsinghua University with a double B.S. in materials science and computer science in 1996. As a graduate student in William Goddard's laboratory at the California Institute of Technology, she worked on molecular modelling, including in nanowires and binary liquid metals. She earned her Ph.D. in materials science in 2001. Her dissertation was entitled "Molecular dynamics (MD) studies on phase transformation and deformation behaviors in FCC metals and alloys."

== Career ==
In 2001, Qi became a research scientist at General Motors Research and Development, where she was recognized for work in interfacial tribology and multiscale modeling of aluminum plasticity. Her research focused on using computational analysis of grain boundaries to improve the strength and flexibility of aluminum panels as well as energy applications such as modelling proton exchange membranes in fuel cells, and studying lithium-ion batteries. Qi had previously completed an internship at General Motors as a graduate student, and joined the company right after graduating where in the next decade, she engineered multiple models used in processes involving metal alloys, energy systems, and batteries. She said that she was one of the few people in General Motors with a physics rather than an engineering background. Beginning in 2009, she also taught classes at the University of Windsor.

In 2013, she joined the faculty of the Department of Chemical Engineering and Materials Science at Michigan State University. Her research program focuses on materials simulation for clean energy, including density functional theory studies of diffusion, and the effects of mechanical deformation, in lithium-ion batteries. During this time she also became vice chair of the Michigan chapter of the American Vacuum Society. She moved to Brown University as a Joan Wernig Sorensen Professor of Engineering starting from July 1, 2020.

Qi has also been involved with numerous science outreach programs for young people such as the Sally Ride Science Festival for Girls. In June 2018 she was appointed as the first Associate Dean for Inclusion and Diversity in the College of Engineering at Michigan State University.

== Awards and honors ==
Qi has received multiple awards in recognition of her work on computational materials both during her time at General Motors and in academia. Her first award came in 1999, where she won the Feynman Prize in Nanotechnology alongside William Goddard and Tahir Cagin. She subsequently won multiple GM Campbell prizes during her time at General Motors. In 2017, Qi won the Brimacombe Medal from The Minerals, Metals & Materials Society in recognition of her scientific contributions to the computational materials field.

=== Other awards ===
2013 FMD Young Leaders Professional Development
