= William Andrew Goddard III =

American chemist (born 1937)

- Born: March 29, 1937 (age 89); El Centro, California, U.S.
- Education: California Institute of Technology; University of California, Los Angeles
- Known for: Generalized valence bond
- Scientific career
- Fields: Theoretical chemistry
- Workplaces: California Institute of Technology
- Thesis: An improved many-electron theory for atoms and molecules which uses eigenfunctions of total spin (1965)
- Doctoral advisor: Pol Duwez
- Doctoral students: Emily Carter; Charles Musgrave
- Other notable students: Post-docs: Alejandro Strachan

Notes
- See festschrift.

William Andrew Goddard III (born March 29, 1937) is the Charles and Mary Ferkel Professor of Chemistry and Applied Physics, and director of the Materials and Process Simulation Center at the California Institute of Technology.

== Early life and education ==
William A. Goddard III was born in El Centro California and lived his early years in farm towns across California (El Centro, Delano, Indio, Lodi, Oildale, MacFarland, Firebaugh, also Yuma AZ), where his dad made the wooden boxes used to ship agricultural products. He always dreamed of living in Los Angeles. Goddard earned a BS in engineering from the University of California at Los Angeles in 1960 and PhD in engineering science with a minor in physics from Caltech in 1964.

He has four children (Bill, Suzy, Cecilia, Lisa) and has been married for 58 years.

== Career ==
He joined the chemistry faculty at Caltech in November 1964 where he remains today as a professor and researcher.

After his Ph.D. he remained at the California Institute of Technology as Arthur Amos Noyes Research Fellow (1964–66), Professor of Theoretical Chemistry (1967–78) and Professor of Chemistry & Applied Physics (1978-). Goddard has made many contributions to theoretical chemistry, such as the generalized valence bond (GVB) method for ab initio electronic structure calculations and the ReaxFF force field for classical molecular dynamics simulations. Goddard's consulting for industrial laboratories on practical problems — engine wear inhibitors, and corrosion, scale, and wax inhibitors in oil pipelines — led him to co-found several companies applying his group's simulation methods commercially. In 1984 he co-founded Molecular Simulations Inc. (later Accelrys, now part of BIOVIA) together with his graduate student Stephen L. Mayo, chairing its board from 1984 to 1991 and remaining a director until 1995. In 1990 he co-founded Schrödinger with Columbia chemist Richard Friesner, serving on its board of directors until 2000. He also co-founded Materials Research Source LLC, reorganized as Systine Inc. in 2003, and the bioinformatics company BionomiX Inc.

Goddard's later ventures moved toward biotechnology. In November 2005 he co-founded the Seattle-based company Allozyne with Caltech colleague David A. Tirrell and postdoctoral researcher Deepshikha Datta, commercializing a Caltech method for substituting non-natural amino acids into protein therapeutics to allow site-specific PEGylation; the company was launched out of the Accelerator Corporation incubator and raised a $30 million Series B in 2008. In 2008 Accelerator backed a second company out of his laboratory, GPC-Rx, based on computational selection of drug candidates with improved target specificity.

He is a member of the International Academy of Quantum Molecular Science and the U.S. National Academy of Sciences.

In August 2007, the American Chemical Society at its biannual national convention celebrated Goddard's 70th birthday with a 5-day symposium titled, "Bold predictions in theoretical chemistry."

As of November 2017, Goddard has published 1160 peer-reviewed articles.

== Research ==
=== Electronic structure theory ===
Working with materials scientist Pol Duwez during his doctoral studies, Goddard developed a many-electron method built on eigenfunctions of total spin, published in a 1967 series in Physical Review as an improved quantum theory of many-electron systems. The approach became known as the generalized valence bond method, which UCLA has described as the first quantum mechanical method able to describe bond breaking and chemical reactions properly. Because the full GVB equations were too costly for all but small systems, Goddard, William J. Hunt and P. Jeffrey Hay introduced in the early 1970s the GVB(PP/SO) approximation, which combines a perfect-pairing spin function with orthogonality between orbitals in different pairs; this form and the associated configuration interaction methods were applied widely through the early 1990s. Beginning in the 1970s his interests broadened from bonding in small molecules to semiconductor surfaces and heterogeneous catalysis.

=== Force fields and reactive dynamics ===
A second strand of Goddard's work has been the development of empirical and semi-empirical potentials intended to extend atomistic simulation to system sizes and timescales beyond the reach of quantum mechanics. With his students he introduced the DREIDING generic force field in 1990 and the Universal Force Field (UFF), parameterized across the full periodic table, in 1992, together with the charge equilibration (QEq) scheme for assigning atomic charges during a simulation. In 2001 Goddard and Adri van Duin introduced ReaxFF, a bond-order force field fitted to quantum mechanical data that allows bonds to form and break during a classical molecular dynamics simulation, making reactive chemistry accessible at scales where explicit quantum treatments are impractical.

=== Matter under extreme conditions ===
With his student Julius Su, Goddard introduced the electron force field (eFF) in 2007, an approximate solution of the time-dependent Schrödinger equation in which each electron is represented by a spherical Gaussian wave packet whose position and radius evolve dynamically. The method was designed to make nonadiabatic simulation of highly excited electronic systems tractable, and reproduced equations of state and single-shock Hugoniot curves for warm dense hydrogen up to 100,000 K. Goddard and Su described applications ranging from Auger fragmentation in diamond nanoparticles to processes relevant to inertial confinement fusion and semiconductor device fabrication, and the method was subsequently used to study the high-temperature, high-pressure phases of lithium. eFF belongs to the wave packet molecular dynamics family and has been taken up by other groups working on warm dense matter and dense plasmas.

=== Atomic theory and effective core potentials ===
Goddard's 1967–69 series in Physical Review applied his spin-eigenfunction formalism, then called the GI or G1 method, to atoms as well as molecules, producing correlated atomic wavefunctions that retained an orbital interpretation. Building on those atomic calculations, Goddard and his student Carl Melius introduced a practical scheme for replacing an atom's chemically inert core electrons with an analytic effective potential fitted to ab initio atomic wavefunctions, first in 1972 with Lawrence Kahn and then in a 1974 formulation designed to exploit the properties of Gaussian basis functions. Because the cost of an all-electron calculation grows steeply with atomic number, the method made heavy elements tractable, and it was extended to the transition metals iron and nickel the same year. Subsequent relativistic effective core potentials, including those of Lee, Ermler and Pitzer, were built on the Goddard–Melius treatment together with that of Kahn, Baybutt and Truhlar.

=== Biomolecular structure prediction ===
From the late 1990s Goddard's group extended its simulation methods to biological systems, concentrating on G protein-coupled receptors (GPCRs), the receptor superfamily that mediates vision, smell, taste and pain and that accounts for a large share of drug targets. At the time an experimental atomic-level structure existed for only one GPCR, bovine rhodopsin, which blocked structure-based drug design for the rest of the family. Goddard and his co-workers developed MembStruk, a first-principles procedure for predicting the three-dimensional structure of a helical membrane protein from sequence, and HierDock, a hierarchical method for predicting where a ligand binds and how strongly. Validating the methods against rhodopsin, they reported predicted structures and binding sites for the β1-adrenergic receptor, endothelial differentiation gene 6, the mouse and rat I7 olfactory receptors and the human sweet receptor, with the predicted epinephrine site in β1-adrenergic receptor matching mutation experiments. The protein calculations used the group's own DREIDING force field and QEq charges, an example of the methodological chain running from Goddard's force-field work into biology.

=== Catalysis and surfaces ===
With Anthony Rappé, Goddard proposed in the early 1980s that high-valent Group VI olefin metathesis catalysts operate through metal–oxo rather than purely alkylidene intermediates, and analyzed the mechanistic relationship between metathesis and epoxidation in chromium and molybdenum complexes. He had earlier formulated the orbital phase continuity principle, a set of selection rules for concerted reactions derived from valence bond rather than molecular orbital reasoning. His group also used nickel clusters of increasing size to model chemisorption on metal surfaces, work that fed the shift of his research toward semiconductor surfaces and heterogeneous catalysis.

== Awards and honors ==
Goddard was elected to the National Academy of Sciences in 1984 and to the International Academy of Quantum Molecular Science in 1988. He is a fellow of the American Physical Society (1988), the American Association for the Advancement of Science (1990), the Royal Society of Chemistry (2008) and the American Academy of Arts and Sciences (2010). His awards include the American Chemical Society Award for Computers in Chemistry (1988), Caltech's Richard M. Badger Teaching Prize in Chemistry (1995), the Foresight Institute Feynman Prize in Nanotechnology for theory (1999, shared with Tahir Cagin and Yue Qi for modeling molecular machines), a NASA Space Sciences Award (2000), the Richard Chase Tolman Medal of the Southern California Section of the ACS (2000), an honorary doctorate from Uppsala University (2004) and the ACS Award in Theoretical Chemistry (2007).
