= James R. Von Ehr II =

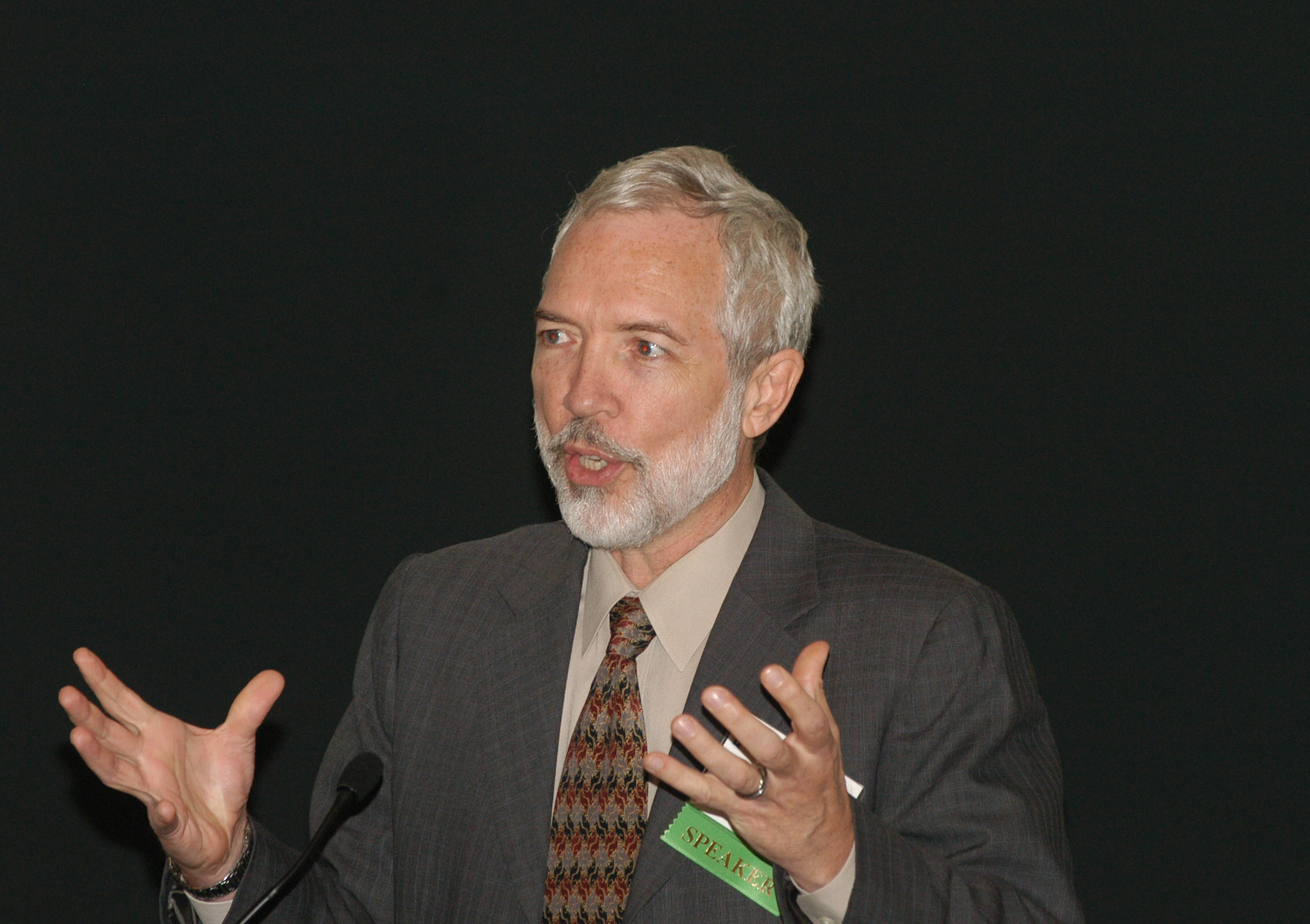
- Born: 1950 (age 75–76); United States
- Citizenship: United States
- Scientific career
- Fields: Nanotechnology
- Institutions: Zyvex

James R. Von Ehr II (born in 1950) is an American programmer, inventor and entrepreneur. Von Ehr is the former chief executive of Zyvex corporation, the world first and most successful molecular nanotechnology company.

Von Ehr founded Zyvex corporation in 1997 with a vision of assembling a nanoassembler. The company started by building microelectromechanical systems (MEMS). Zyvex later split into four branches (Zyvex Technologies, Zyvex Instruments (acquired by DCG Systems, Inc.), Zyvex Labs, and Zyvex Asia), and current CEO of Zyvex Labs and chairman of Zyvex Technologies. Von Ehr founded Altsys Corporation in Dec 1984, and was President, Chairman, and CEO. Altsys was known for developing Fontographer, a PostScript-based font editor, and later FreeHand, a powerful PostScript-based illustration program for graphics artists and designers. Altsys was sold to Macromedia in 1995, where Von Ehr held a seat on the Board of Directors for nearly four years.

In 2000, Von Ehr founded the Texas Nanotechnology Initiative and contributed to the passage of the Nanotechnology Research and Development Act in 2003.
