= Zyvex =

Molecular nanotechnology company

- Founded: 1997; 29 years ago
- Founder: Jim Von Ehr
- Headquarters: Richardson, Texas, United States
- Website: zyvex.com

Zyvex is a molecular nanotechnology company, founded by James R. Von Ehr II in 1997.

In April 2007, the corporation split into four components: Zyvex Technologies, Zyvex Instruments (focused on tools, instrumentation, and applications for the semiconductor and advanced research markets), Zyvex Labs, and Zyvex Asia. The family of companies has since produced notable achievements such as the more than 170 patents, which are used in the companies own products or licensed to other companies. These include a number of techniques for dispersing carbon nanotubes in polymers and other high-performance composite materials used in semiconductor fabrication. The company has also developed software such as the technology for automating the atom-plopping.

In 2009, Zyvex announced the creation of Zyvex Marine, a new division that focuses on the design and development of advanced maritime platforms. By 2010, the division was able to produce a lightweight prototype craft that features 75 percent less fuel consumption.

Zyvex Technologies was acquired by OCSiAl in 2014, a Luxembourg-based carbon nanotube manufacturer and this was said to have created the world's largest nanotechnology company. The merger expanded Zyvex's portfolio with the addition of new products in health care, automotive, and sports such as medical prosthetics, aerospace coatings, and even hockey sticks. Zyvex has contributed to the nano-retina which is a prosthetic visionary device and has also contributed to nano-probing devices used in microscopes.
