= Charles Musgrave =

American chemist, engineer and materials scientist

- Born: Los Angeles, California, U.S.
- Education: University of California, Berkeley; California Institute of Technology
- Known for: Nanotechnology, Atomic Layer Deposition
- Awards: Foresight Institute Feynman Prize in Nanotechnology
- Scientific career
- Fields: Chemical engineering, materials science
- Workplaces: University of Colorado, Boulder
- Thesis: Molecular Mechanics and Ab Initio Simulations of Silicon (111) Surface Reconstructions, Semiconductors and Semiconductor Superlattices, H Abstraction for Nanotechnology, Polysilane, and Growth of CVD Diamond (1994)
- Doctoral advisor: William Andrew Goddard III

Charles Musgrave is an American chemist, engineer and materials scientist. He won the 1993 Foresight Institute Feynman Prize in Nanotechnology.

He earned his Ph.D. at the California Institute of Technology in 1994, his B.S. at the University of California at Berkeley and was a postdoctoral fellow at the Massachusetts Institute of Technology. He previously taught chemical engineering and materials science and engineering at Stanford University, chemistry at Harvard University and chemical engineering at the University of Colorado, Boulder, where he was professor from 2008 to 2024, chair of the department of chemical and biological engineering from 2016 to 2020 and associate dean of graduate education for the College of Engineering and Applied Science. He is currently the Dean of the Price College of Engineering at the University of Utah and professor of chemical engineering and materials science and engineering.

His field of research involves using computational quantum mechanical and machine-learning methods to model molecular processes and materials. The goals of his research include the discovery and design of materials for catalysis and electrocatalysis, energy conversion and storage as well as the chemistry of microelectronics, nanofabrication and polymerization.
