= Piranha Unmanned Surface Vessel =

The Piranha Unmanned Surface Vessel (USV or unmanned surface vehicle) is a watercraft developed by Zyvex Marine (a division of Zyvex Technologies) in 2010. The boat is 16 metres (52 ft) in length and weighs about 3,600 kg (7,900 lb). The Piranha utilizes a lightweight carbon-nanotube material called Arovex, which allows the watercraft to weigh less than other USVs.

The weight advantage from Arovex gives the Piranha a payload capacity of 6,800 kg (15,000 lb) and a range of over 4,000 kilometres (2,500 mi). Additionally, the carbon nanotubes provide a strength increase of 20–50% over traditional materials. The Piranha was expected to be sold as a possible tool for anti-piracy, search and rescue, submarine hunting, and harbor patrol.

The first Piranha began construction in February 2010 with an anticipated completion date of summer 2010. The Piranha underwent sea trials near Seattle's Puget Sound during the months of October and November 2010.

The Piranha concluded approximately 6 months and 600 nautical miles (1,100 km; 690 mi) of sea trials in Washington state and Oregon state on April 4, 2011.
