= Schrödinger, Inc. =

American life sciences company

- Type: Public
- Traded as: Nasdaq: SDGR; Russell 2000 Component; S&P 600 Component
- Industry: Software; Life Sciences; Materials Science; Computational Chemistry; Cheminformatics
- Founded: 1990; 36 years ago
- Founder: Richard A. Friesner, William A. Goddard III
- Headquarters: New York, New York
- Area served: Worldwide
- Key people: Ramy Farid (president & CEO); Michael Lynton (chairman)
- Products: Advanced computational platform for drug discovery and materials science; LiveDesign; PyMOL
- Revenue: ▲US$256 million (2025)
- Net income: ▲ −US$103 million (2025)
- Number of employees: 1015
- Website: schrodinger.com

Schrödinger, Inc. is an international scientific software and biotechnology company that specializes in developing computational tools and software for drug discovery and materials science.

Schrödinger's software is used by pharmaceutical companies, biotech, tech, chemicals, energy, aerospace firms, and academic researchers to simulate and model the behavior of molecules at the atomic level. This accelerates the design and develops new drugs and materials more efficiently, reducing the time and cost of bringing them to market.

Schrödinger's software tools include molecular dynamics simulations, free energy calculations, quantum mechanics calculations, and virtual screening tools. The company also offers consulting services and collaborates with partners in the industry to advance the field of computational chemistry and drug discovery.

== Products and services ==
Schrödinger's computational platforms evaluate compounds in silico, with experimental accuracy on properties such as binding affinity and solubility. The company's products include molecular modeling programs in life science, and Materials Science, and an Enterprise Informatics Platform named LiveDesign, which is intended to facilitate communication among interdisciplinary research teams.

=== Life Science Applications ===
==== Small Molecular Discovery ====
- Structure Prediction & Target Enablement
- Hit Discovery
- Hit-to-Lead & Lead Optimization
- Drug Formulation

==== Biologics Discovery ====
- Antibody Design
- Peptide Discovery
- Enzyme Engineering

=== Material Science Applications ===
- Organic Electronics
- Polymeric Materials
- Consumer Packaged Goods
- Catalysis & Reactivity
- Thin Film Processing Energy Capture & Storage
- Pharmaceutical Formulations & Delivery
- Metals, Alloys & Ceramics

In addition to computational platforms, Schrödinger develops custom software for enterprises, as well as training, computer-cluster design and implementation, and research-based drug discovery projects.

Schrödinger software licenses are available to academic institutions for education and not-for-profit research.

== Partners ==
Schrödinger's partners include pharmaceutical companies, including Bayer, Takeda, heavy industries, including Boeing, Sabic, and more.

Nimbus Therapeutics, co-founded by Schrödinger, uses Schrödinger's drug screening and design platform for drug discovery. In 2016, Nimbus Therapeutics sold an Acetyl-CoA carboxylase (ACC) inhibitor designed by Schrödinger to Gilead Sciences in a deal worth up to $1.2 billion. As of spring 2019 the ACC inhibitor was moving through late-stage clinical trials in non-alcoholic steatohepatitis.

== Recognition ==
In November 2013, Schrödinger, in collaboration with Cycle Computing and the University of Southern California, set a record for the world's largest and fastest cloud computing run by using 156,000 cores on Amazon Web Services to screen over 205,000 molecules for materials science research. That work was a follow-up to a 2012 collaboration which saw Cycle Computing creating a 50,000 core virtual supercomputer using Amazon and Schrödinger's infrastructure; at that time, it was used to analyze 2.1 million compounds in 3 hours.
