= Chemical Physics (journal) =

- Language: English
- Edited by: Mischa Bonn, Tianquan Lian, Yi Luo

Publication details
- History: 1973–present
- Publisher: Elsevier
- Frequency: Monthly
- Impact factor: 2.348 (2020)

Standard abbreviations
- ISO 4: Chem. Phys.

Indexing
- CODEN: CMPHC2
- ISSN: 0301-0104 (print); 1873-4421 (web)
- OCLC no.: 01786275

Links
- Journal homepage; Online access

Chemical Physics is a peer-reviewed scientific journal of physical chemistry. The journal was established in 1973 and is published by Elsevier on a monthly basis. The current editors are Mischa Bonn, Tianquan Lian, and Yi Luo.

== Indexing and abstracting ==
The journal is indexed and abstracted in the following bibliographic databases:

- Chemical Abstracts
- ERDA Abstracts
- INSPEC
- Current Contents
- Physikalische Berichte
- Physics Abstracts
- Nuclear Engineering Abstracts
- Scopus
