= Reactive empirical bond order =

The reactive empirical bond-order (REBO) model is a function for calculating the potential energy of covalent bonds and the interatomic force. In this model, the total potential energy of system is a sum of nearest-neighbour pair interactions which depend not only on the distance between atoms but also on their local atomic environment. A parametrized bond order function was used to describe chemical pair bonded interactions.

The early formulation and parametrization of REBO for carbon systems was done by Tersoff in 1988, based on works of Abell. The Tersoff's model could describe single, double and triple bond energies in carbon structures such as in hydrocarbons and diamonds. A significant step was taken by Brenner in 1990. He extended Tersoff's potential function to radical and conjugated hydrocarbon bonds by introducing two additional terms into the bond order function.

Compared to classical first-principle and semi-empirical approaches, the REBO model is less time-consuming, since only the 1st- and 2nd-nearest-neighbour interactions were considered. This advantage of computational efficiency is especially helpful for large-scale atomic simulations (from 1000 to 1000000 atoms). In recent years, the REBO model has been widely used in the studies concerning mechanical and thermal properties of carbon nanotubes.

Despite numerous successful applications of the first-generation REBO potential function, its several drawbacks have been reported. e.g. its form is too restrictive to simultaneously fit equilibrium distances, energies, and force constants for all types of C-C bonds, the possibility of modeling processes involving energetic atomic collisions is limited because both Morse-type terms go to finite values when the atomic distance decreases, and the neglect of a separate pi bond contribution leads to problems with the overbinding of radicals and a poor treatment of conjugacy.

To overcome these drawbacks, an extension of Brenner's potential was proposed by Stuart et al. It is called the adaptive intermolecular reactive bond order (AIREBO) potential, in which both the repulsive and attractive pair interaction functions in REBO function are modified to fit bond properties, and the long-range atomic interactions and single bond torsional interactions are included. The AIREBO model has been used in recent studies using numerical simulations.
