= Zyvex Technologies =

American materials company

- Type: Private
- Industry: Materials
- Predecessor: Zyvex Corporation
- Founded: 2007
- Headquarters: Columbus, Ohio, United States
- Number of locations: Richardson, Texas, Rapid City, South Dakota
- Key people: James R. Von Ehr II, Chairman and Founder; Lance Criscuolo, President
- Parent: Zyvex
- Divisions: Zyvex Marine
- Website: http://zyvextech.com

Zyvex Technologies (formerly Zyvex Performance Materials, ZPM) is a molecular engineering company headquartered in Columbus, Ohio. Zyvex Technologies focuses on developing advanced materials, including prepreg, epoxy resins, and adhesives.

== History ==
Zyvex Technologies is a privately held company and does not publicly report its revenue or all of its customers. It has supply chain and operational partners in Ohio, Texas, South Dakota, and Washington. They are a 2007 spin-off from Zyvex, the world's first molecular nano-technology company. In 2009, Zyvex Technologies shared a $4.9 million grant from the Ohio Third Frontier program. This funding goes toward developing advanced 'nano-enhanced' plastics with Polyone Corporation, as well as advanced resin systems with Hexion Specialty Chemicals.

In October 2010, Zyvex Performance Materials changed its name to Zyvex Technologies.

== Divisions and Developments ==
Their Engineered Solutions team develops special applications of nano-materials in composites. Historically, carbon nanotubes (CNTs) and graphene were inherently strong but considered difficult to use in materials because of molecular bonding challenges. Zyvex Technologies is notable for having developed molecules that solve these dispersion problems with its Kentera technology.

Zyvex's Advanced Composites Solutions team helps develop products built from proprietary technology. One more notable project is the Piranha Unmanned Surface Vessel (USV). This 54-foot boat weights 8,000 lbs and has three times the payload and ten times the range compared to other USVs built from traditional materials, such as aluminum.

Zyvex formally launched its marine division, Zyvex Marine, on November 4, 2011, to handle all boat creation activities.

== Customers ==
Zyvex Technologies supplies materials and provides new product development support to customers in many markets, including defense, marine, automotive, coatings, energy, aerospace, sporting goods, medical, and ballistics.
