= Richard A. Friesner =

American theoretical chemist

- Born: August 9, 1952 (age 74); Carle Place, NY
- Education: University of Chicago; University of California, Berkeley
- Known for: Density functional theory, Protein structure prediction, Force Fields, Molecular docking, Structure-based drug design
- Awards: American Academy of Arts and Sciences (2008), National Academy of Sciences (2016)
- Scientific career
- Fields: Chemistry
- Workplaces: Columbia University
- Doctoral advisor: Kenneth Sauer

Richard A. Friesner is an American theoretical chemist and William P. Schweitzer Professor of Chemistry at Columbia University. He was elected to the American Academy of Arts and Sciences in 2008, and the National Academy of Sciences in 2016. Richard Friesner co-founded Schrödinger in 1990.
